= Persona poetry =

Written from the perspective of a 'persona' that a poet creates

Persona poetry is poetry that is written from the perspective of a 'persona' that a poet creates, who is the speaker of the poem. Dramatic monologues are a type of persona poem, because "as they must create a character, necessarily create a persona".

The editors of A Face to Meet the Faces: The Anthology of Contemporary Persona Poetry state that "The literary tradition of persona, of writing poems in voices or from perspectives other than the poet's own, is ancient in origin and contemporary in practice." Furthermore, a wide range of characters are created in persona poems from a variety of sources, including, "popular culture, history, the Bible, literature, mythology, newspaper clippings, legends, fairy tales, and comic books."

Stock characters of pantomime and commedia dell'arte, such as Pierrot, have been revived by twentieth century poets such as T. S. Eliot and Giannina Braschi, and by singer-songwriters such as David Bowie. Modernist poets Ezra Pound, Fernando Pessoa, Rainer Maria Rilke, and confessional poet Sylvia Plath also wrote persona poems.

== Origins and development ==
See also Persona (psychology)

The word persona is derived from Latin, where it originally referred to a theatrical mask. While "the dramatic monologue as a poetic form achieved its first era of distinction in the work of Victorian poet Robert Browning", there were precursors in Classical literature, including that of China. The editors of Anthology of Contemporary Persona Poetry explains that the "wide-ranging and far-reaching" function of the persona poem in the literary tradition, has operated from an "early" point in history to orally relay the chronicles of significant "cultural and historical events".

The persona poem evolved further in the twentieth century when the term 'persona' became popularised in psychology and anthropology by theorists in these fields. For Swiss psychiatrist Carl Jung, persona was the social face the individual presented to the world: "a kind of mask, designed on the one hand to make a definite impression upon others, and on the other to conceal the true nature of the individual".

=== Lyrical subject ===
The lyrical subject (lyrical speaker or lyrical I) is the voice, or person narrating the words of a poem or other lyrical work. The lyrical subject is a conventional literary figure, historically associated with the author, although it is not necessarily the author who speaks for themselves in the subject. The lyrical subject may be an anonymous, non-personal, or stand-alone entity; the author as a subject; the author's persona or some other character appearing and participating within the story of a poem (an example would be the speaker of "The Raven" by Edgar Allan Poe – a lonely man who misses his lost love Leonor, who is not to be identified with Edgar Allan Poe).

=== Confessional poetry ===
Confessional poetry is a style of poetry that emerged in the United States during the 1950s, that has been described as poetry of the personal or "I", focusing on extreme moments of individual experience, the psyche, and personal trauma, including previously and occasionally still taboo matters such as mental illness, sexuality, and suicide, often set in relation to broader social themes. It is sometimes also described as a form of Postmodernism.

Irving Howe argues that a "confessional poem would seem to be one in which the writer speaks to the reader, telling him, without the mediating presence of imagined event or persona, something about his life".

== Themes and interpretation ==
Poet Rebecca Hazelton explains that the persona poem permits "a great deal of control over the distance between a speaker and the audience", and that "the persona poem can accommodate a variety of speakers and dramatic situations". Hazelton states that the persona poem poses a "puzzle", because while it is an "artifice" it is also a "very intimate form of poetry". The writer is able to speak directly to the reader in a persona poem, and "forges an almost interpersonal relationship with them". Timothy Steele explains that a distinct thematic feature of the persona poem is its ability for the poet to "measure personal experience against a comprehensive type", allowing the poem to advance from "the general to the particular". The poet achieves this through presenting an archetype at the poem's beginning, and cultivating the ideas, feelings, and issues surrounding this archetype over the course of the poem's development.

Persona poetry, using dramatic monologues, has also been used to convey themes of racial tension. Ryan Sharp states that the 2000s have seen a sharp rise in Black American poets using the persona, interrogating poetic material in the Archive, such as Rita Dove's Rosa Parks in On the Bus with Rosa Parks (1999). Sharpe notes that the majority of the poems in The Big Smoke by Adrian Matejka (2013), about Jack Johnson — the first African American to claim the title of world heavyweight champion – "are 'persona' poems: poetic monologues written in Johnson's voice". Sharp explains that contemporary black historical persona poetry functions as a reaction against "dehumanised black bodies and silenced black voices". Further, black persona poetry is a means to demonstrate past and current micro and macro-aggressions against African-Americans. African-American poets are "taking on the voices of infamous folk figures in order to reimagine and expand archival and contemporary notions of blackness." The personae of black folk heroes has allowed poets to fictively re-imagine "new, more complex narratives for them which better project the intersubjective black 'soul'."

== Notable works ==
=== Classical Chinese poetry ===
The use of a poetic persona is often encountered in Classical Chinese poetry, in which the author writes a poem from the viewpoint of some other person (or type of person). Often these persona types were quite conventional, such as the lonely wife left behind at home, the junior concubine ignored and sequestered in the imperial harem, or the soldier sent off to fight and die beyond the remote frontier.

Part of the legacy associated with fu poetry (206 BCE – CE 220) is its use as a form of sociopolitical protest, such as the theme of the loyal minister who has been unjustly exiled by the ruler or those in power at the court, rather than receiving the promotion and respect which he truly deserves. In the Verses of Chu, one of the works attributed to Qu Yuan is the "Li Sao", which is one of the earliest known works in this tradition, both as ancestral to the fu as well as its incorporation of political criticism as a theme of poetry. The theme of unjust exile is related to the development of Xiaoxiang poetry, or the poetry stylistically or thematically based upon lamenting the unjust exile of the poet, either directly, or allegorically through the use of the persona of a friend or historical figure (a safer course in the case of a poet-official who might be punished for any too blatant criticism of the current emperor).

=== Roman poetry ===
The Heroides are fifteen epistolary poems composed by Ovid (43 BCE – 17/18 CE) in Latin elegiac couplets and presented as though written by a selection of aggrieved heroines of Greek and Roman mythology in address to their heroic lovers who have in some way mistreated, neglected, or abandoned them. In the third book of his Ars Amatoria, Ovid argues that in writing these fictional epistolary poems in the personae of famous heroines, rather than from a first-person perspective, he created an entirely new literary genre. The full extent of Ovid's originality in this matter has been a point of scholarly contention Consensus concedes to Ovid the lion's share of the credit in the thorough exploration of what was then a highly innovative poetic form.

=== English language poetry ===
Robert Browning's dramatic monologue "My Last Duchess" (1842) typifies the formalistic qualities of the persona poem: dramatic tension, manipulating the reader experience, and removing the distance between speaker and reader. More recently T. S. Eliot's 1915 'The Love Song of J Alfred Prufrock' was influential on the persona poem. "Prufrock" is a dramatic interior monologue of an urban man, stricken with feelings of isolation and an incapability for decisive action that is said "to epitomize frustration and impotence of the modern individual". Ezra Pound was an admirer of Browning and he frequently used masks or personae (Personae is the title of collection of shorter poems by him).

Rather than the poem representing the voice of the author, as in much lyric poetry, the speaker in Pound's persona poems is a made-up character with whom Pound did not completely identify. This allowed Pound to be satiric, even sarcastic, not only about the subject of the poems but about their speaker, although he sometimes appears to share the sentiments of the poem's persona, making for an interesting ambiguity.

Pound set an example for later modernists to follow; two examples are "Maximus, to himself" by Charles Olson and "Linnaeus in Lapland" by Lorine Niedecker. The persona poem can encompass the imagined perspective of voices that are not human, as in Roman poet Ovid's Heroides collection of epistolary poems mentioned above. In Tennyson's dramatic monologue "Tithonus", Tithonus addressing his consort Eos, the goddess of the dawn. Similarly Margaret Atwood's 'Siren Song' (1974) is narrated from the voice of a mythical creature, a siren. "Ellen West" (1977) by American poet Frank Bidart (b. 1939) is another celebrated example, drawn from the life of Ellen West (1888–1921).

=== Portuguese poetry ===
The modernist poet Fernando Pessoa created over 72 personae and heteronyms. Literary alter egos were popular among early twentieth-century poets. For example, Ezra Pound had Mauberley, Rilke had Malte Laurids Brigge, and Valéry had Monsieur Teste. However, no other poet, according to the Academy of American Poets, took an alter ego as far as Pessoa, who assigned a biography, psychology, politics, aesthetics, religion, and physique to each persona. Pessoa's most famous personae are: Alberto Caeiro, a self-taught poet who wrote in free verse; Ricardo Reis, a physician who wrote odes influenced by Horace; and Álvaro de Campos, a naval engineer influenced by poet Walt Whitman and the Italian Futurists. Pessoa also created the personae of a philosopher and sociologist António Mora, an essayist Baron of Teive, an astrologer Raphael Baldaya, and many others, for a total of at least 72 heteronyms.

=== Spanish language poetry ===
Giannina Braschi's Empire of Dreams (1988) is a Postmodern work of epic poetry that pays homage to the Commedia dell'arte's. In the second part of Empire of Dreams, entitled "La Comedia Profana", (1985) clowns, buffoons, harlequins, witches, shepherds, and fortune tellers give first-person narratives of their adventures in modern-day New York City. These stock characters take over the city streets, stores, and tourist attractions, such as Macy's, the Empire State Building, St. Patrick's Cathedral, Central Park. There are many absurd vignettes, such as traffic jams caused by the flocks of sheep that are grazing on 5th Avenue. Braschi's dramatic poems give a comedic twist to the genre of the Spanish Golden Age of Pastoral poetry

== Performance ==
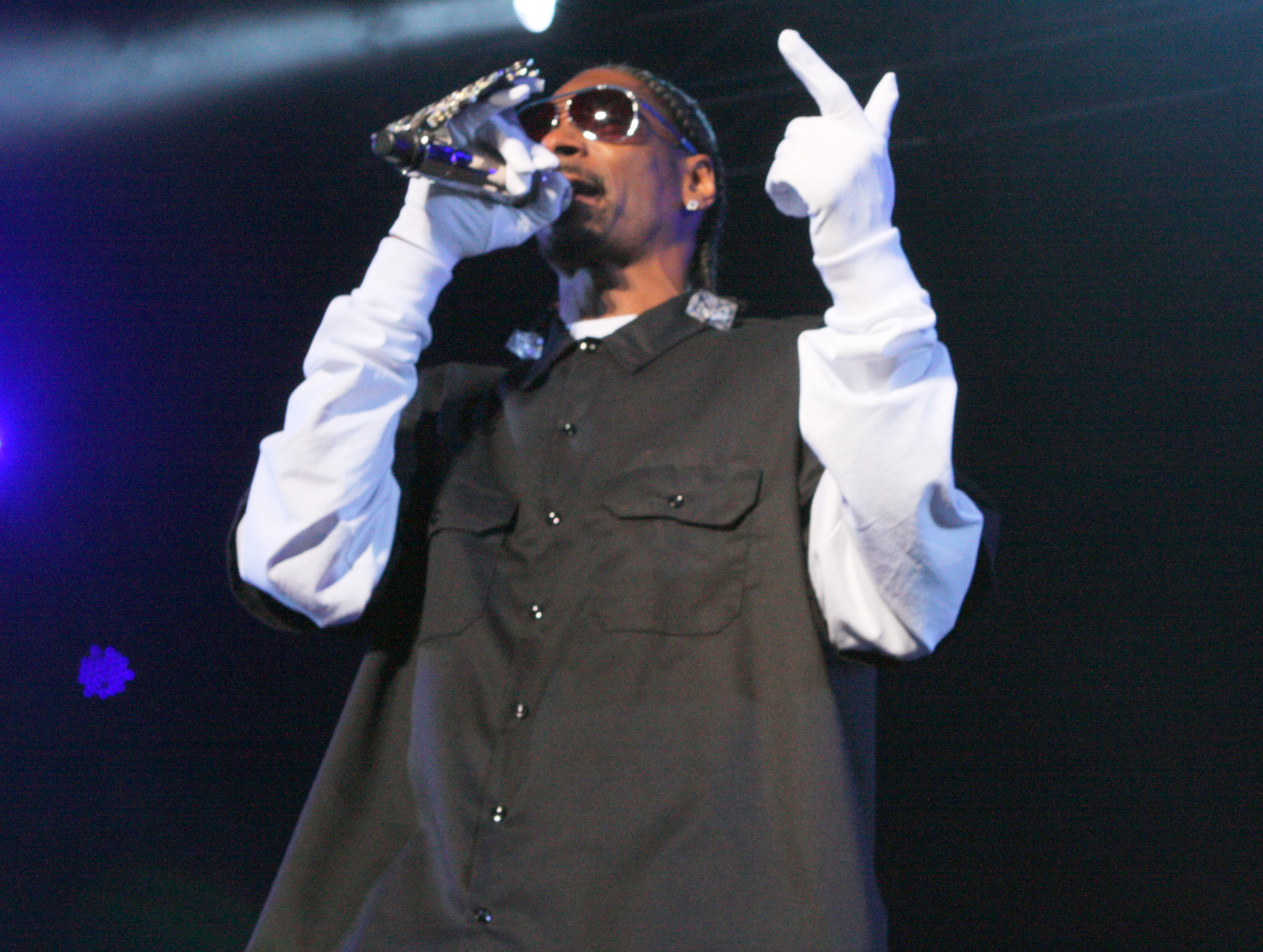
Snoop Dogg at the Snoop Dogg Supafest, 2011.

Persona poetry has developed further in the twenty-first century in the form of rap and other popular music, as well as through more traditional poetry. Celebrity figures such as rapper Snoop Dogg have constructed alter-egos through which to write and perform songs, and through this Snoop Dogg persona is able to portray "a cool, yet violent man" to deliver "theatrically exaggerated threats". Some similar examples include, Nicki Minaj's 'Roman Zolanski' and Eminem's 'Slim Shady'.

Poetry slams are another mode through which persona poetry has continued into the twenty-first century, as the spoken word allows for a performative experience for audiences. Poets are able to use gesture, voice, and other forms of body language for delivery. Minal Hajratwala has explained her use of persona as resulting from her different identities, including "Gujarati, queer, diasporan, San Franciscan, poet, performer, writing-coach, editor, recovering journalist, and more." Hajratwala claims that this hybrid postmodern identity is conducive to employing the persona to either merge these identities into one cohesive speaker, or express using multiple personae.

== See also ==
- Characterization
- Interior Monologue
- Lyric Poetry
- Rudy Ray Moore, comedian, who created a persona
- Narrative poetry
- Performance Poetry
- Pierrot
- The Personal Heresy
- Stream-of-consciousness
- Verse drama and dramatic verse
- Writer's voice
