= Count Gismond =

Poem by Robert Browning

"Count Gismond" is a poem by Robert Browning, frequently anthologised as an example of the dramatic monologue. It first appeared in 1842 in Browning's Dramatic Lyrics, where it was known simply as "France".

The poem is written in 21 verses.

"Count Gismond: Aix in Provence" may, on one reading, be seen as a story of the vindication of innocence. A woman relates to a friend an episode of her own life, when a defender arose for her when she was caught in the toils woven by the unsuspected envy and hypocrisy of her cousins and Count Gauthier, who attempt to bring dishonor upon her on her birthday, with an accusation that she and Gauthier had been lovers. Her faith that the trial by combat between Gauthier and Gismond must end in Gismond's victory and her vindication reflects, in this reading, the medieval atmosphere of an idealised chivalrous France.

However an alternative reading of the poem, suggested by various hints in the verse (e.g. the absence of the narrator's denial of her relationship with Gauthier, the evasive way she breaks off her story when Gismond arrives), hints that the woman may be an 'unreliable narrator', as in the poem 'My Last Duchess'.

On a third interpretation, the ambiguity between these two readings is the poem's major attribute.
