= Porphyria's Lover =

1836 poem written by Robert Browning

"Porphyria's Lover" is a poem by Robert Browning which was first published as "Porphyria" in the January 1836 issue of Monthly Repository. Browning later republished it in Dramatic Lyrics (1842) paired with "Johannes Agricola in Meditation" under the title "Madhouse Cells". The poem did not receive its definitive title until 1863.

"Porphyria's Lover" is Browning's first ever short dramatic monologue, and also the first of his poems to examine abnormal psychology. Although its initial publication passed nearly unnoticed and received little critical attention in the nineteenth century, the poem is now heavily anthologised and much studied.

In the poem, a man strangles his lover – Porphyria – with her hair; "... and all her hair / In one long yellow string I wound / Three times her little throat around, / And strangled her." Porphyria's lover then talks of the corpse's blue eyes, golden hair, and describes the feelings of perfect happiness the murder gives him and his surprise at God's subsequent silence. Although he winds her hair around her throat three times to throttle her, the woman never cries out. The poem uses a somewhat unusual rhyme scheme: A,B,A,B,B, the final repetition bringing each stanza to a heavy rest.

A possible source for the poem is John Wilson's "Extracts from Gosschen's Diary", a lurid account of a murder published in Blackwood's Magazine in 1818. Browning's friend and fellow poet Bryan Procter acknowledged basing his 1820 "Marcian Colonna" on this source, but added a new detail; after the murder, the killer sits up all night with his victim.

== Psychological interpretations ==
Browning's monologues are frequently voiced by eccentrics, lunatics, or people under emotional stress. Their ramblings illustrate character by describing the interactions of an odd personality with a particularly telling set of circumstances. In both "Porphyria's Lover" and "My Last Duchess", Browning uses this mode of exposition to describe a man who responds to the love of a beautiful woman by killing her. Each monologue offers the speaker's reasons for the desired woman from subject to object: in "My Last Duchess", the Duke may have jealously murdered his wife, but keeps a portrait of her behind a curtain so none can look upon her smile without his permission; in "Porphyria's Lover", the persona wishes to stop time at a single perfect moment and so kills his lover and sits all night embracing her carefully arranged body. In "My Last Duchess" the woman's murder is at best implied, while in "Porphyria's Lover" it is described quite explicitly by the speaker. The unchanging rhythmic pattern may also suggest the persona's insanity.

The "Porphyria" persona's romantic egotism leads him into all manner of monstrously selfish assumptions compatible with his own longings. He seems convinced that Porphyria wanted to be murdered, and claims "No pain felt she" while being strangled, adding, as if to convince himself, "I am quite sure she felt no pain." He may even believe she enjoyed the pain, because he, her lover, inflicted it. When she is dead, he says she has found her "utmost will", and when he sees her lifeless head drooping on his shoulder, he describes it as a "smiling rosy little head", possibly using the word "rosy" to symbolise the red roses of love, or to demonstrate his delusion that the girl, and their relationship, are still alive. More likely, however, is the thought that blood returning to her face, after the strangulation, makes her cheeks "rosy". Her "rosy little head" may also be a sly reference to the hymen; Porphyria leaves a "gay feast" and comes in from the outside world wearing "soiled gloves"; now her blue eyes, open in death, are "without a stain". The lover may also be a fetishist, indicated by the fact that he refers to her hair numerous times throughout the poem, and strangles her with it. He also refers to the "shut bud that holds a bee" which backs up the view of it being a sexual fetish.

Other sources speculate that the lover might be impotent, disabled, sick, or otherwise inadequate, and, as such, unable to satisfy Porphyria. There is much textual evidence to support this interpretation: he describes himself as "one so pale / for love of her, and all in vain." At the beginning of the poem, the persona never moves; he sits passively in a cold, dark room, sadly listening to the storm until Porphyria comes through "wind and rain", "shuts the cold out and the storm," and makes up his dying fire. Finally, she sits beside him, calls his name, places his arm around her waist, and puts his head on her shoulder; she has to stoop to do this. At the poem's midpoint, the persona suddenly takes action, strangling Porphyria, propping her body against his, and boasting that afterward, her head lay on his shoulder.

In line with the persona's suggested weakness and sickness, other scholars take the word "porphyria" literally, and suggest that the seductress embodies a disease, and that the persona's killing of her is a sign of his recovery. Porphyria, which usually involved delusional madness and death, was classified several years before the poem's publication; Browning, who had an avid interest in such pathologies, may well have been aware of the new disease, and used it in this way to express his knowledge.

Much has been made of the final line: "And yet, God has not said a word!" Possibly, the speaker seeks divine condonement for the murder. He may believe God has said nothing because He is satisfied with his actions. God may be satisfied because: He recognises that the persona's crime is the only way to keep Porphyria pure; or, because He doesn't think her life and death are important compared to the persona's. The persona may also be waiting in vain for some sign of God's approval. Alternatively, the line may represent his feelings of emptiness in the wake of his violence; Porphyria is gone, quiet descends, and he's alone. The persona may also be schizophrenic; he may be listening for a voice in his head, which he mistakes for the voice of God. It has also been postulated that this is Browning's statement of "God's silence", in which neither good nor bad acts are immediately recompensed by the deity.

The final line may also register the persona's sense of guilt over his crime. Despite his elaborate justifications for his act, he has, in fact, committed murder, and he expects God to punish him – or, at least, to take notice. The persona is surprised, perhaps a little uneasy, at God's continued silence.

== As tableau vivant ==
The mirrored effect produced by Porphyria's modelling of the persona in the first half, and the persona's reciprocal modelling of her after strangulation is indicative of the popular Victorian art form tableau vivant, in which humans were used as art to recreate actual paintings. This is indicative of the allegorical content of "Porphyria's Lover" in which both characters imitate the process of artistic creation: when art is created or published, it is dead and forever unchanging. In the last few lines of the poem, Porphyria is manipulated in much the same way as the speaker was in the first few lines of the poem. Tennyson shares similar ideas in "The Lady of Shalott", as do other Victorian authors who contribute to the popular conversation about the artistic processes.

== See also ==
- My Last Duchess – A wealthy nobleman delivers a monologue telling a guest that he had his former wife killed because everybody and everything she saw seemed to make her happy. Now, she exists only as a painting on the wall, which he usually keeps concealed behind a curtain so none but he can see the look of happy welcome on her face.
- Soliloquy of the Spanish Cloister – A comic monologue in which a monk spews out venom against one of his colleagues, Brother Lawrence; in the process, he merely reveals his own depravity while showing what a good, pious man his "enemy" is.
- "Where the Wild Roses Grow" – A contemporary song sharing similar themes.
