= Ellen West =

Famous existential psychology case study

Ellen West (1888–1921) was a patient of Dr. Ludwig Binswanger who had anorexia nervosa. She became a famous example of Daseinsanalysis who died by suicide at age 33 by poisoning herself.

== Life ==
Ellen West was born to a Jewish family in 1888. When Ellen was 10 years old, she and her family immigrated to Europe. As a young woman, she was stubborn, disobedient, intelligent, and obsessive compulsive. But while in school, she proved to be an ambitious and passionate student. She also enjoyed reading and writing poetry. As a young adult, Ellen had fluctuations with her weight and that was when her fear of becoming fat began. In her writings, she expressed her strong cravings for food, she had an extreme fear of gaining weight. These thoughts eventually led to the development of depression. In order to stay thin, Ellen started to take laxatives; sometimes taking as many as sixty to seventy packs a day. Ellen was given permission to marry her cousin at the age of 28. She became obsessed with wanting a child; however, she would not adjust her poor eating habits, which resulted in a miscarriage. Ellen decided to discontinue her use of laxatives in order to get pregnant, but her fears of weight gain overpowered her and she began using them again. She became so frail and unhealthy that she no longer menstruated. When Ellen turned 30, she decided to become a vegetarian in hopes to maintain her thin figure. It wasn't until after three years of marriage, when Ellen was 31 years old and weighing 92 pounds (42 kilograms), that she informed her husband of her severe eating disorder and depression.

== Death ==
Ellen West's life was marred by thoughts related to death anxiety. Towards the end of her life, it could be said that she had a death obsession. West was given a great variety of diagnoses including melancholia, severe obsessive neurosis, and schizophrenia. While her major problem dealt with food, as what started out as a diagnosis of anorexia nervosa morphed into bulimia nervosa with the fear of becoming fat through eating. This fixation caused her great depression, as her focus day in and out was on eating or not eating. This "obsession with death" became "life's only goal" and that the "symbolization of life and death took place around the act of eating." West's fear of becoming fat caused her to welcome death as an acceptable outcome, as then she wouldn't have to worry anymore. She was often quoted by her psychiatrist, Ludwig Binswanger, explaining how her life felt like a prison that could be only made better by dying. To West, her life felt empty and dull, and filling her body with food only made her feel worse. Filling herself with food actually made her feel empty. It was even suggested that suicide by starvation became her life's purpose, whereas continuing to feed herself would be equal to committing murder on someone. This underlying issue of death obsession can be exemplified by other harmful behaviors that she engaged in. West reportedly did several dangerous things to invite illness and death, including riding horse dangerously, kissing children with scarlet fever, and standing outside naked after bathing. Her eventual death came after taking a lethal dose of poison, having spent a full day eating to satisfaction, reading poetry and writing. West's psychiatrist Binswanger was quoted as saying, "She looked as she had never looked in life - calm and happy and peaceful." He thought of her illness as a defense against anxieties which were heightened and overbalanced, but anxieties nonetheless.

== Existential psychology and humanistic psychology ==
Ludwig Binswanger first diagnosed Ellen West using existential analysis. Using this school of thought showed that Ellen had bulimia nervosa and dreaded gaining weight. Existential analysis suggested that it is necessary to understand people in a deeper, more philosophical way rather than a strictly scientific way. The psychologist Rollo May exemplified this notion when he said that "Man is the being who can be conscious of, and therefore responsible for, his existence." In the arena of existential psychology, Binswanger concluded that her bulimia was the expression of an existential vacuum to fill up her needs. Binswanger thought that the initial diagnosis of manic-depressive psychosis was wrong because of a lack of manic phases. Also, her symptoms could be explained as normal rather than pathological, and Ellen West could be diagnosed with schizophrenia. Finally, in the view of therapeutic nihilism, Binswanger let her leave the Kreuzlingen clinic, and she later died because of drug overdose, with her husband Karl present and consenting. She legally protected him writing that he did not know what she was going to do. Carl Rogers, a humanistic psychologist who already in 1961 wrote a book in which he dealt with Ellen West's case, felt upset that she was regarded as an object by Binswanger and suggested that she would be better if treated with client-centered therapy. Rogers also thought that her history was not pathological and she was an active girl. After breaking off her engagement because of disagreement with her parents, Ellen West experienced the estrangement of man from herself. It led her to lose a sense of belief about her experiences. To fit herself to other people's opinion, she lost weight and developed a dread of gaining weight. Binswanger diagnosed her with schizophrenia and he was pessimistic about her condition, fearing she would die by suicide after leaving the clinic; Rogers thought that this kind of thought made Ellen think herself disordered. Rogers suggested that if she opened her mind to her own experiences and accepted them, she could communicate with herself and it would lead her to developing better relationships with others.

== In popular culture ==
Ellen West's life influenced poet Frank Bidart to write a Persona poem entitled "Ellen West." Decades later, Bidart also wrote a follow-up poem entitled "Writing 'Ellen West,'" which, in contrast to the first poem, speaks directly on the poet's experiences with West's story and its impact on him.

The composer Ricky Ian Gordon composed an opera based on the Bidart poem. It was first staged at Opera Saratoga in 2019.

Alternative rock band Throwing Muses recorded a song called "Ellen West" on their 1991 album The Real Ramona.

Ellen West is mentioned in "What I Loved: A Novel" by Siri Hustvedt as a case study in a book about eating disorders published by Violet, a character in the novel.

The Italian poet Simone Consorti dedicated to Ellen West his homonymous short poem "Ellen".

== See also ==
- Anorexia nervosa
- Existential therapy
