= Existential therapy =

Form of psychotherapy

Existential therapy is a form of psychotherapy focused on the client's lived experience of their subjective reality. The aim is for clients to use their freedom to live authentic fulfilled lives. Existentialist traditions maintain:

- People are fundamentally free to shape their lives and are responsible for their choices, even under difficult circumstances.
- Distress around existential concerns—such as death, isolation, freedom, and the search for meaning—are not pathological, but natural parts of the human condition and potential catalysts for living more authentically.
- An emphasis on exploring the client's subjective world and lived experience, rather than providing an authoritative interpretation of what feelings mean.
- A de-emphasis on standardized techniques, favoring instead a collaborative, dialogical encounter grounded in authentic presence, openness, and mutual exploration of the client's world.
- A critique of reductionist models of mental health that attempt to explain psychological suffering solely in terms of symptoms, diagnoses, or biological causes.

== Background ==
The philosophers who are especially pertinent to the development of existential psychotherapy are those whose works were directly aimed at making sense of human existence. The fields of phenomenology and existential philosophy are especially and directly responsible for the generation of existential therapy. The starting point of existential philosophy (see Warnock 1970; Macquarrie 1972; Mace 1999; van Deurzen and Kenward 2005) were the works of Søren Kierkegaard and Friedrich Nietzsche. Their works conflicted with the predominant ideologies of their time and committed to the exploration of reality.

=== Søren Kierkegaard (1813–1855) ===
Soren Kierkegaard (1813–1855) protested vehemently against popular misunderstanding and abuse of Christian dogma and the so-called 'objectivity' of science (Kierkegaard, 1841, 1844). He thought that both were ways of avoiding the anxiety inherent in human existence. He had great contempt for the way life was lived by those around him and believed truth could only be discovered subjectively by the individual in action. He felt people lacked the courage to take a leap of faith and live with passion and commitment from the inward depth of existence. This involved a constant struggle between the finite and infinite aspects of our nature as part of the difficult task of creating a self and finding meaning. As Kierkegaard lived by his word, he was lonely and much ridiculed during his lifetime.

=== Friedrich Nietzsche (1844–1900) ===
Friedrich Nietzsche (1844–1900) took this philosophy of life a step further. His starting point was the notion that God is dead, that is, the idea of God was outmoded and limiting (Nietzsche, 1861, 1874, 1886). Furthermore, the Enlightenment—with the newfound faith in reason and rationality—had killed or replaced God with a new Truth that was perhaps more pernicious than the one it replaced. Science and rationality were the new "God," but instead took the form of a deity that was colder and less comforting than before. Nietzsche exerted a significant impact upon the development of psychology in general, but he specifically influenced an approach which emphasized an understanding of life from a personal perspective. In exploring the various needs of the individual about the ontological conditions of being, Nietzsche asserted that all things are in a state of "ontological privation," in which they long to become more than they are. This state of deprivation has major implications for the physiological and psychological needs of the individual.

=== Edmund Husserl (1859–1938) ===
While Kierkegaard and Nietzsche drew attention to the human issues that needed to be addressed, Edmund Husserl's phenomenology (Husserl, 1960, 1962; Moran, 2000) provided the method to address them rigorously. He contended that natural sciences assume the separateness of subject and object and that this kind of dualism can only lead to error. He proposed a whole new mode of investigation and understanding of the world and our experience of it. He said that prejudice has to be put aside or 'bracketed,' for us to meet the world afresh and discover what is absolutely fundamental, and only directly available to us through intuition. If people want to grasp the essence of things, instead of explaining and analyzing them, they have to learn to describe and understand them.

=== Max Scheler (1874–1928) ===
Max Scheler (1874–1928) developed philosophical anthropology from a material ethic of values ("Materielle Wertethik") that opposed Immanuel Kant's ethics of duty ("Pflichtethik"). He described a hierarchical system of values that further developed phenomenological philosophy. Scheler described the human psyche as being composed of four layers analogous to the layers of organic nature. However, in his description, the human psyche is opposed by the principle of the human spirit. Scheler's philosophy forms the basis of Viktor Frankl's logotherapy and existential analysis.

=== Martin Heidegger (1889–1976) ===
Martin Heidegger (1889–1976) applied the phenomenological method to understanding the meaning of being (Heidegger, 1962, 1968). He argued that poetry and deep philosophical thinking could bring greater insight into what it means to be in the world than what can be achieved through scientific knowledge. He explored human beings in the world in a manner that revolutionized classical ideas about the self and psychology. He recognized the importance of time, space, death, and human relatedness. He also favored hermeneutics, an old philosophical method of investigation, which is the art of interpretation.

Unlike interpretation as practiced in psychoanalysis (which consists of referring a person's experience to a pre-established theoretical framework), this kind of interpretation seeks to understand how the person himself/herself subjectively experiences something.

=== Jean-Paul Sartre (1905–1980) and French existentialism ===
Jean-Paul Sartre (1905–1980) significantly shaped existential psychology by emphasizing human freedom, responsibility, and the construction of meaning in a world devoid of inherent purpose. His work on ‘radical freedom’ - the idea that humans are "condemned to be free" and must take full responsibility for their actions - is a fundamental aspect of existential therapy. Under this framework, anxiety is not seen as a sort of medical pathology, but a natural process that occurs when individuals are confronted with this burden of choice.

In addition, the works of Albert Camus, Simone de Beauvoir, Maurice Merleau-Ponty, and Emmanuel Lévinas were also highly influential. Simone de Beauvoir expanded existentialism into feminist and relational territory, emphasizing that individuals must not only assert their own freedom but also recognize the freedom of others. Camus explored the experience of absurdity (the conflict between the human need for meaning and the indifferent universe) and argued for an ethic of personal responsibility and defiant authenticity. Merleau-Ponty brought phenomenology into dialogue with psychology by highlighting the embodied nature of consciousness, showing that perception, emotion, and experience are always rooted in the lived body and situated in a social and physical world. Finally, Lévinas added an important ethical dimension, saying that we become truly human through our responsibility to others, especially when we recognize their vulnerability and need for care. Additional figures who laid the work for existentialist psychology include:

- Karl Jaspers, a philosopher and psychiatrist credited with founding the field of phenomenological psychiatry. This approach moved away from the reductionist medical model of mental illness in favor of understanding the patient's subjective, lived experience. His writings on "limit situations", moments where humans encounter existential boundaries of human existence, was also fundamental.
- Friedrich Schleiermacher, Wilhelm Dilthey, and Hans-Georg Gadamer, central figures in the development of hermeneutics, or the philosophy of interpretation. Dilthey argued that while the role of the natural sciences was to explain, the role of the human sciences should be to understand lived experience.
- Martin Buber, whose concept of the I-Thou relationship formed the model for the therapeutic relationship in existential therapy. Under this framework, the client should not be treated as a thing to be analyzed (an I-IT relationship). Rather, the therapist and client should have a relationship characterized by mutual presence, empathy, and authentic openness.
- Paul Tillich, an existentialist theologian who explored anxiety in The Courage to Be (1952). In it, he described anxiety as a fundamental part of human existence that comes from confronting death, guilt, and meaninglessness. Rather than treating anxiety as a symptom that must be removed, it is a gateway to developing authentic faith and courage. His notion of "ultimate concern", or the idea that each person is oriented toward something that gives their life ultimate meaning, resonates with existential psychology's emphasis on values, purpose, and the individual's search for meaning in an uncertain world.

In addition to philosophers, existential psychology was influenced by many writers whose work touched on existential themes, such as Fyodor Dostoevsky, Leo Tolstoy, Franz Kafka, Rainer Maria Rilke, and Henrik Ibsen.

== Existentialism and therapy ==
Throughout the 20th century, psychotherapists began incorporating both the themes of existentialism as well as the phenomenological methods of describing experience into their therapeutic practice: Otto Rank (1884–1939) was an Austrian psychoanalyst who broke with Freud in the mid-1920s. He did not consider himself an existential therapist, but his ideas revolving the concept of "will" as a factor in human motivation, as well as the fear of death and the fear of living authentically would pave the foundation for later writers. Throughout the 1930s and 1940s, the Swiss psychiatrists Ludwig Binswanger and Medard Boss each developed a form of psychotherapy known as Daseinsanalysis. Daseinsanalysis merges Freudian psychoanalysis with the existential phenomenology of Martin Heidegger, particularly his concept of Dasein ("being"). It focuses on understanding the client's experience of Being-in-the-world, rather than diagnosing symptoms.

In America, topics in existential therapy were first touched on by Rollo May in his works The Meaning of Anxiety (1950) and Man’s Search for Himself (1953). In 1958, he published Existence: A New Dimension in Psychiatry and Psychology, a collection of essays by May and others that - in addition to providing the first English translations of Binswanger's work - was the first major text to introduce existential therapy to an American audience. During the 1950s and 60s, May worked closely with Paul Tillich and James Bugental to help develop a uniquely American strand of existential-humanistic therapy. May also worked closely with Carl Rogers and Abraham Maslow, founders of the humanistic psychology movement. As such, existential therapy in America became closely associated with humanistic psychology and the principles of Rogers's person-centered therapy, particularly on its emphasis on an empathetic, relational therapeutic relationship as a vehicle for personal growth.

Meanwhile, Viktor Frankl (1905–1997) authored the best-selling work Man's Search for Meaning (1946), which created a unique branch of existential therapy known as Logotherapy. Logotherapy is premised on the idea that the primary motivation of individuals is to find meaning in life. Man's Search for Meaning was a worldwide bestseller, selling more than 16 million copies and translated into more than 50 languages. In the United Kingdom, the psychiatrist R.D. Laing became a central figure of the anti-psychiatry movement that emerged in the 60s. Laing was inspired by the European existential-phenomenological tradition and the psychiatrist Karl Jaspers, rejecting the medical model and emphasized a style of therapy that attempted to understand the client's subjective world before attempting any explanation or treatment. In his groundbreaking work The Divided Self (1960), he argued that conditions such as schizophrenia were not medical brain disorders but existential crises of the self, often rooted in interpersonal alienation and social "double binds".

In 1980, Irvin D. Yalom published Existential Psychotherapy. This book was the first to provide a comprehensive overview of existential therapy. In it, Yalom identifies four existential concerns, or "givens", of life that underlie human experience - death, freedom, isolation, and meaninglessness. Yalom argues that the role of the therapist in existential therapy is not to provide solutions or answers, but to guide the client in exploring and confronting these challenges. Unlike other forms of therapy, Yalom does not prescribe specific techniques, rather, Yalom suggests existential therapy should be a personalized collaboration between therapist and client, tailored to each clients’ unique existential concerns.

=== Schools ===
Existential therapy is not a single, unified practice, but rather a family of approaches grounded in existential philosophy. However, modern texts on existential therapy have identified four major "schools" of existential therapy, each with their own philosophical history and focus:

- Daseinsanalysis. Founded by Ludwig Binswanger and Medard Boss, Daseinanalysis focuses on Martin Heidegger's existential phenomenology, especially his discussion of Dasein (Boss himself worked closely with Heidegger for many decades). Daseinanalysis does not treat psychological problems as "symptoms" to be "fixed" but instead the ways a client expresses their "being-in-the-world" (In-der-Welt-sein) - their unique and situated way of relating to time, space, others, and themselves, which may have become distorted or closed off in response to existential challenges. For example, someone who suffers from chronic procrastination would not be seen as a behavioral issue, but rather an issue of someone struggling in their existential relationship to time. There are no manualized techniques or interventions, and unlike Freudian psychoanalysis the therapist's job is not to "interpret" the client's symptoms for hidden meanings. Instead, the role of the therapist is to engage in phenomenological dialogue, adopting an open and curious stance to help reflect on the client's lived experience.
- Logotherapy and existential analysis. Founded by Viktor Frankl, Logotherapy emphasizes the "will to meaning" as the central human drive. Philosophically, he drew extensively from Max Scheler's phenomenology, particularly Scheler's belief in a real, objective hierarchy of values. His worldview was also profoundly influenced by his experiences in the Nazi concentration camps. Frankl felt that the primary human motivation was to find meaning in life, and psychological suffering stemmed from a loss of meaning, not neurotic conflicts or cognitive errors. Suffering occurs when people experience a "existential vacuum", characterized by boredom, apathy, and a sense of emptiness. Many mental illnesses such as depression and drug addiction are thought to be a result of these feelings of emptiness. Logotherapy aims to help clients discover or reconnect with personal meaning in their lives. Later on, Alfried Längle expanded these ideas into his own Personal Existential Analysis (PEA), which aims to not just help clients find meaning but also help clients understand their values so they can make authentic decisions.
- Existential-humanistic therapy. Founded by Rollo May and James Bugental and later expanded on by Irvin Yalom, this school emerged as a result of the close mutual relationship between existential therapy and humanistic psychology in the United States during the 1950s and 60s. This fusion retained many of the ideas from European existentialists while incorporating the more optimistic attitude of humanistic psychologists that emphasized personal growth. A significant focus is on freedom of choice: Humans are free to make choices, but these choices carry a heavy responsibility, often causing people to retreat from these decisions or conform to social norms. Both existential and humanistic therapy share the foundational idea that people are motivated towards personal growth, and the goal of therapy is to help clients live authentic and meaningful lives that are in line with their values. Therapists in this tradition drew heavily on the principles developed by the humanistic psychologist Carl Rogers and his person-centered therapy.
- Existential-phenomenological therapy. Originally known as the London School of Existential Therapy and later British School of Existential Therapy, this school was born out of the work of R.D. Laing and later formalized by Emmy van Deurzen. Emmy van Deurzen believed all human beings struggled with existential issues, not just those with schizophrenia, and took Laing's work and established a systematic methodology for an existential-phenomenological approach. Similar to Daesinanalysis, the heart of the approach is its focus on phenomenological inquiry, where the client is encouraged to describe their experience in rich detail. Here, the therapist's role is not to "analyze" or "diagnose" the client. Rather, the goal is to engage in a collaborative dialogue aimed at uncovering how the client experiences their world across multiple dimensions: physical, personal, social, and spiritual. By doing so, the therapist is able to help clients clarify values, confront choices, and live more authentically.

In addition to these four schools, therapists have begun to incorporate existential themes into their therapeutic practices. In 2007, Kirk Schneider, a protege of Rollo May, developed and published a book on Existential-Integrative Therapy, to emphasize the flexible and adaptive way existential therapy can be integrated with other therapy modalities. Contemporary therapists have published works discussing how existential themes can be incorporated in cognitive-behavioral therapy, narrative therapy, constructivist therapies, and psycho-oncology. Paul T. P. Wong has also written at length on incorporating existential themes in positive psychology, creating a unique version of "existential positive psychology".

== Development ==
=== In Europe ===
The European School of existential analysis is dominated by two forms of therapy: Logotherapy, and Daseinsanalysis. Logotherapy was developed by psychiatrist Viktor E. Frankl. Frankl was heavily influenced by existential philosophy, as well as his own experience in the Nazi concentration camps of World War II. The three main components to Logotherapy are Freedom of Will, which is the ability to change one's life to the degree that such change is possible, Will to Meaning, which places meaning at the center of well-being, and Meaning in Life, which asserts the objectivity of meaning. The primary techniques of Logotherapy involve helping the clients to identify and remove any barriers to the pursuit of meaning in their own lives, to determine what is personally meaningful, and to then help patients effectively pursue related goals. Daseinsanalysis is a psychotherapeutic system developed upon the ideas of Martin Heidegger, as well as the psychoanalytic theories of Sigmund Freud, that seeks to help the individual find autonomy and meaning in their "being in the world" (a rough translation of "Dasein").

=== In Britain ===
Britain became a fertile ground for further development of the existential approach when R. D. Laing and David Cooper, often associated with the anti-psychiatry movement, took Sartre's existential ideas as the basis for their work (Laing, 1960, 1961; Cooper, 1967; Laing and Cooper, 1964). Without developing a concrete method of therapy, they critically reconsidered the notion of mental illness and its treatment. In the late 1960s, they established an experimental therapeutic community at Kingsley Hall in the East End of London, where people could come to live through their 'madness' without the usual medical treatment. They also founded the Philadelphia Association, an organization providing an alternative living, therapy, and therapeutic training from this perspective. The Philadelphia Association is still in existence today and is now committed to the exploration of the works of philosophers such as Ludwig Wittgenstein, Jacques Derrida, Levinas, and Michel Foucault as well as the work of the French psychoanalyst Jacques Lacan. It also runs some small therapeutic households along these lines. The Arbours Association is another group that grew out of the Kingsley Hall experiment. Founded by Joseph Berke and Schatzman in the 1970s, it now runs a training program in psychotherapy, a crisis center, and several therapeutic communities. The existential input in the Arbours has gradually been replaced with a more neo-Kleinian emphasis.

The impetus for further development of the existential approach in Britain has primarily come from the development of some existentially based courses in academic institutions. This started with the programs created by Emmy van Deurzen, initially at Antioch University in London and subsequently at Regent's College, London and since then at the New School of Psychotherapy and Counselling, also located in London. The latter is a purely existentially based training institute, which offers postgraduate degrees validated by the University of Sheffield and Middlesex University. In the past few decades, the existential approach has spread rapidly and has become a welcome alternative to established methods. There are now many other, mostly academic, centers in Britain that provide training in existential counseling and psychotherapy and a rapidly growing interest in the approach in the voluntary sector and the National Health Service.

British publications dealing with existential therapy include contributions by these authors: Jenner (de Koning and Jenner, 1982), Heaton (1988, 1994), Cohn (1994, 1997), Spinelli (1997), Cooper (1989, 2002), Eleftheriadou (1994), Lemma-Wright (1994), Du Plock (1997), Strasser and Strasser (1997), van Deurzen (1997, 1998, 2002), van Deurzen and Arnold-Baker (2005), and van Deurzen and Kenward (2005). Other writers such as Lomas (1981) and Smail (1978, 1987, 1993) have published work relevant to the approach, although not explicitly 'existential' in orientation. The journal of the British Society for Phenomenology regularly publishes work on existential and phenomenological psychotherapy. The Society for Existential Analysis was founded in 1988, initiated by van Deurzen. This society brings together psychotherapists, psychologists, psychiatrists, counselors, and philosophers working from an existential perspective. It offers regular fora for discussion and debate as well as significant annual conferences. It publishes the Journal of the Society for Existential Analysis twice a year. It is also a member of the International Federation of Daseinsanalysis, which stimulates international exchange between representatives of the approach from around the world. An International Society for Existential Therapists also exists. It was founded in 2006 by Emmy van Deurzen and Digby Tantam and is called the International Community of Existential Counsellors and Therapists (ICECAP).

=== Development in Canada ===
New developments in existential therapy in the last 20 years include existential positive psychology, as well as meaning therapy. Different from the traditional approach to existential therapy, these new developments incorporate research findings from contemporary positive psychology. Existential positive psychology can reframe the traditional issues of existential concerns into positive psychology questions that can be subjected to empirical research. It also focuses on personal growth and transformation as much as on existential anxiety. Later, existential positive psychology was incorporated into the second wave of positive psychology.

Meaning therapy (MT) is an extension of Frankl's logotherapy and America's humanistic-existential tradition; it is also pluralistic because it incorporates elements of cognitive-behavioral therapy, narrative therapy, and positive psychotherapy, with meaning as its central organizing construct. MT not only appeals to people's natural desires for happiness and significance but also makes skillful use of their innate capacity for meaning-seeking and meaning-making. MT strikes a balance between a person-centered approach and a psycho-educational approach. At the outset of therapy, clients are informed of the use of meaning-centered interventions appropriate for their predicaments because of the empirical evidence for the vital role of meaning in healing and thriving. MT is a comprehensive and pluralistic way to address all aspects of clients' existential concerns. Clients can benefit from MT in two ways: (1) a custom-tailored treatment to solve their presenting problems, and (2) a collaborative journey to create a preferred better future.

== Themes ==
Existential themes are issues that are considered central to human existence or the human experience. As such, they are broad and are often difficult to describe. The most common framework is given by Irvin Yalom, who divides existental issues into four core themes:

- Death. The fact that humans are aware of their own inevitable death - and uncertain about what happens after - can cause considerable distress. Some people go to great lengths to deny or avoid thinking about death, while others may succumb to despair or hopelessness. Existential therapy aims to help clients embrace life more fully by recognizing the finite nature of their existence.
- Freedom and responsibility. Alongside humanistic psychology, existential therapy places a great deal of importance on the concept of free will. Humans have the freedom to make choices and create their own meaning in life. To be free means to be responsible for one's life and to be the author of one's own destiny. However, this freedom carries with it a tremendous amount of responsibility. Experiencing existential guilt over the choices we have made and the possibilities of what could have been is a natural part of life. If overwhelmed by the responsibility to choose, people may defer to external authorities and societal norms to make decisions for them. Existential therapy encourages clients to recognize their freedom and live more authentic lives by taking responsibility for their actions, choices, and direction in life.
- Isolation. Yalom describes existential isolation as "An unbridgeable gap between oneself and any other being. It refers, too, to an isolation even more fundamental—a separation between the individual and the world." This represents the tension between the fact that humans are inherently social creatures, and long to be connected to others - Yet at the same time no one can fully share or take on another's subjective experience, pain, or death. People may attempt to avoid these feelings of isolation through becoming dependent on others or conforming to social norms. Existential therapy helps clients confront their aloneness by building authentic relationships, where connections with others are based on mutual respect rather than an avoidance of isolation.
- Meaning and meaninglessness. Humans seek out meaning - the question of "What is the meaning of life?" is one of the most central questions to philosophy. Existential philosophers argue that there is no "inherent," fundamental meaning in the world. Rather, the task falls on the individual for *discovering* or *creating* their own meaning in life. This realization can be incredibly distressing to people. In existential therapy, clients learn to create personal meaning through their actions, values, and relationships rather than relying on external, fixed sources of meaning. Viktor Frankl's logotherapy specifically focuses on how a lack of meaning in life can lead to severe mental distress.

In addition to these four themes, a central concept that underlies existential therapy is existential anxiety, more colloquially known as an existential crisis. When people become aware of these existential themes, they feel anxiety, guilt, or other forms of distress. Unlike Freudian or medical models of mental illness that strictly view anxiety as a "symptom" that must be "cured", existential therapy stresses that existential anxiety is an inevitable part of life. Under this framework, anxiety is not seen as something to be eliminated but as a natural and even necessary part of life, and that working through these anxieties can provide a powerful source of personal growth and transformation.

To this end, one of the central goals of existential therapy is to help clients live with authenticity. To live with authenticity means to fully acknowledge life's existential givens without avoiding them. It also means to live a life that is in line with one's personal values. Many people live inauthentic lives by succumbing to peer pressure or conformity. Existential therapists guide clients to reflect on their values, choices, and patterns of behavior to identify areas whether they may be living inauthentically. For example, a client may be stuck in an unfulfilling job that does not align with their values or stuck in an unsatisfying relationship due to their fear of loneliness. By helping clients confront existential anxiety, clarify their values, and find areas where they can exercise their freedom, therapists support them in creating a life that feels true, meaningful, and fully their own.

== Psychological dysfunction ==
Because there is no single existential view, opinions about psychological dysfunction vary. For theorists aligned with Yalom, psychological dysfunction results from the individual's refusal or inability to deal with the normal existential anxiety that comes from confronting life's "givens": death, freedom, isolation, and meaninglessness. For other theorists, there is no such thing as psychological dysfunction or mental illness. Every way of being is merely an expression of how one chooses to live one's life. However, one may feel unable to come to terms with the anxiety of being alone in the world. If so, an existential psychotherapist can assist one in accepting these feelings rather than trying to change them as if there is something wrong. Everyone has the freedom to choose how they are going to exist in life; however, this freedom may go unpracticed. It may appear easier and safer not to make decisions that one will be responsible for. Many people will remain unaware of alternative choices in life for various societal reasons.

== Personal element ==
Existential counsellors stress the importance of the examined life, and of preparatory work on oneself, in paving the way for effective counselling. Thus in counselling adolescents the counsellor can optimally model an autonomous life based on the making of realistic decisions, but one which also acknowledges the role of failure as well as success in everyday life, and the ongoing and inescapable presence of anxiety. The strictly Sartrean perspective of existential psychotherapy is generally unconcerned with the client's past, but instead, the emphasis is on the choices to be made in the present and future. The counselor and the client may reflect upon how the client has answered life's questions in the past, but attention ultimately shifts to searching for a new and increased awareness in the present and enabling a new freedom and responsibility to act. The patient can then accept that they are not special and that their existence is simply coincidental, or without destiny or fate. By accepting this, they can overcome their anxieties and instead view life as moments in which they are fundamentally free.

== Four worlds ==
Existential thinkers seek to avoid restrictive models that categorize or label people. Instead, they look for the universals that can be observed cross-culturally. There is no existential personality theory which divides humanity into types or reduces people to part components. Instead, there is a description of the different levels of experience and existence with which people are inevitably confronted. The way in which a person is in the world at a particular stage can be charted on this general map of human existence (Binswanger, 1963; Yalom, 1980; van Deurzen, 1984). In line with the view taken by van Deurzen, one can distinguish four basic dimensions of human existence: the physical, the social, the psychological, and the spiritual; some only believe in the first three. On each of these dimensions, people encounter the world and shape their attitude out of their particular take on their experience. Their orientation towards the world defines their reality. The four dimensions are interwoven and provide a complex four-dimensional force field for their existence. Individuals are stretched between a positive pole of what they aspire to on each dimension and a negative pole of what they fear. Binswanger proposed the first three of these dimensions from Heidegger's description of Umwelt and Mitwelt and his further notion of Eigenwelt. The fourth dimension was added by van Deurzen from Heidegger's description of a spiritual world (Überwelt) in Heidegger's later work.

== Research support ==
Existential therapies have shown varying efficacy in adults, with meaning-centered therapies improving life meaning and moderately reducing psychopathology, supportive-expressive therapy showing small benefits for psychopathology, and experiential-existential and cognitive-existential therapies showing no significant effects; despite limited and low-quality evidence, structured interventions incorporating psychoeducation, exercises, and discussion of meaning appear most promising. In the debate on evidence-based research in counselling, existential counsellors tend to stress the dangers of over-simplification, and the importance of qualitative as well as quantitative measurements of outcome. While not necessarily expecting an easy resolution of the specific/non-specific factors in therapy debate, an existential counsellor will nonetheless favor evidence-based practice.

== See also ==
- Ludwig Binswanger
- Medard Boss
- Gestalt Therapy
- Existentialism
- Viktor Frankl
- Paul T. P. Wong
- Martin Heidegger
- Thomas Hora
- Søren Kierkegaard
- R. D. Laing
- Rollo May
- Clark Moustakas
- Karlfried Graf Dürckheim
- Friedrich Nietzsche
- Otto Rank
- Jean-Paul Sartre
- Irvin D. Yalom
- Karl Jaspers
- Martin Buber
- Contextual therapy
- Emmy van Deurzen
- William Glasser
- Metapsychiatry
- Philosophical Consultancy
- Jan Hendrik van den Berg
- Martti Olavi Siirala
- Kirk J. Schneider
