= Tithonus (disambiguation) =

Tithonus is a figure in Greek mythology known for being granted immortality without eternal youth.

Tithonus may also refer to:

- "Tithonus" (poem), a poem by Alfred, Lord Tennyson
- Tithonus poem, a mostly complete fragment of a poem by Saphho
- "Tithonus" (The X-Files), an episode of the TV series The X-Files
- 6998 Tithonus, a Trojan asteroid
- Tithonus Birdwing, Ornithoptera tithonus, a birdwing butterfly
- Tithonus, one of over 100 subgenera within the weevil genus Otiorhynchus

== See also ==
- Tithonos, son of Eos and Cephalus in Greek mythology
- Tithonos, Consort of Eos who was granted immortality but not eternal youth
- Tithonian, the final stage of the Late Jurassic epoch
- Titon et l'Aurore, an opera by the French composer Jean-Joseph de Mondonville
