= Hora (surname) =

Hora is a surname. The Czech and Slovak surname Hora (feminine: Horová) means 'mountain' and originated as a designation for someone who comes from the mountains or from a place called Hora. In some dialects, the word also meant 'forest' and the surname could refer to a person living near a forest. Notable people with the surname include:

- Carlos Hora (born 1945), Peruvian sport shooter
- Ioan Hora (born 1988), Romanian footballer
- Jakub Hora (born 1991), Czech footballer
- Jan Hora (1900–1953), Czech police chief and water polo player
- John Hora (1940–2021), American cinematographer
- Josef Hora (1891–1945), Czech poet, literary critic and translator
- Luis Hora (1910–1972), Filipino geologist and politician
- Sunder Lal Hora (1896–1955), Indian ichthyologist
- Heinrich Hora (born 1931), German-Australian theoretical physicist
- Thomas Hora (1914–1995), American psychiatrist
- Tomio Hora (1906–2000), Japanese historian

== See also ==
- Nina da Hora (born 1995), Brazilian activist and computer scientist
