= Johannes Agricola in Meditation =

"Johannes Agricola in Meditation" (1836) is an early dramatic monologue by Robert Browning. The poem was first published in the Monthly Repository; later, it appeared in Dramatic Lyrics (1842) paired with Porphyria's Lover under the title "Madhouse Cells". Agricola's "meditations" serve primarily as a critique of antinomianism. The speaker believes in an extreme form of predestination, claiming that, since he is one of the elect, he can commit any sin without forfeiting his afterlife in heaven.
