= Jan Hendrik van den Berg =

Dutch psychiatrist

Jan Hendrik van den Berg (11 June 1914 – 22 September 2012) was a Dutch psychiatrist notable for his work in phenomenological psychotherapy (cf. phenomenology) and metabletics, or "psychology of historical change." He is the author of numerous articles and books, including A different existence and The changing nature of man.

== Biography ==
Jan Hendrik (J.H.) van den Berg was born on 11 June 1914 in Deventer, the Netherlands. Between 1933 and 1936, he earned diplomas in primary school and high school education, the latter with a focus on mathematics. He also published papers on entomology. He then entered medical school at Utrecht University specializing in psychiatry and neurology. He completed his doctoral dissertation in 1946. One year later, after studying in both France and Switzerland, Dr. Van den Berg was appointed to Head of Department at the psychiatry clinic at Utrecht. At Utrecht, he lectured in psychopathology in the medical school and was also appointed to Professor of Pastoral Psychology in the theology department. In 1954, Dr. van den Berg took a position of Professor of Psychology at Leiden University. Since 1967, he has been a visiting professor at many universities and conducted lecture tours internationally.

Having lived most of his later life in a monumental house at the market in the historical center of Woudrichem, he died in nearby Gorinchem.

== Select bibliography ==
- A phenomenological approach to psychiatry: An introduction to recent phenomenological psychopathology (w/ M. Farber) (1955)
- The changing nature of man: Introduction to an historical psychology (1956)
- Things: Four metabletic reflections (1970)
- A different existence: Principles of phenomenological psychopathology (1972)(ISBN 0-8207-0244-7)
- The psychology of the sickbed (1972)
- Divided existence and complex society: An historical approach (1974)
- The two principle laws of thermodynamics: A cultural and historical exploration (2004)

== Works Influenced by van den Berg ==
- Kruger, D. (Ed.). (1985). The changing reality of modern man: Essays in honour of J.H. van den Berg. Pittsburgh, PA: Duquesne University Press.
- Romanyshyn, R. (1989). Technology as symptom and dream. New York: Routledge.
- Romanyshyn, R. (2001). Mirror and Metaphor. Pittsburgh, PA: Trivium.
- Simms, E.M. (2008). The Child in the World: Embodiment, Time, and Language in Early Childhood. Detroit: Wayne State University Press.
- Stivers, R. (2004). Shades of loneliness: Pathologies of a technological society. New York: Rowman & Littlefield.

== See also ==
- Ludwig Binswanger
- Edmund Husserl
- Existential Psychology
- Karl Jaspers
