= Medard Boss =

Swiss psychiatrist

Medard Boss (October 4, 1903, St. Gallen – December 21, 1990, Zollikon) was a Swiss psychoanalytic psychiatrist who developed a form of psychotherapy known as Daseinsanalysis, which united the psychotherapeutic practice of psychoanalysis with the existential phenomenological philosophy of friend and mentor Martin Heidegger.

== Work ==
During his medical studies in Vienna, he initiated his psychoanalytic training by undergoing some psychoanalytic sessions with Sigmund Freud, an analysis he later continued at length in Zurich with Swiss psychoanalyst Hans Behn Eschenburg.

Also upon his return to Zurich, he trained at Burghölzli Hospital under the supervision of the psychiatrist Eugen Bleuler. He then went on to formal psychoanalytic training at the Berlin Psychoanalytic Institute where his supervisory analyst was Karen Horney. While at BPI he studied with Hanns Sachs, Otto Fenichel, Wilhelm Reich, and Kurt Goldstein.

He later went to London, where he worked closely with Ernest Jones for six months at the National Hospital for Nervous Diseases. Back in Zurich he was invited by Carl Gustav Jung to join a workshop with other medical doctors to study analytical psychology, an experience that lasted nearly ten years and helped Boss to see that psychoanalysis need not be limited to Freudian interpretations. It was during the 1930s that Boss also became acquainted with Ludwig Binswanger, who introduced Boss to the works of philosopher Martin Heidegger.

During World War II, while serving in the Swiss Army, Boss began studying Heidegger's Being and Time and, upon the conclusion of the war, Boss contacted Heidegger, initiating a 25-year mentoring friendship. Through his study with Heidegger, Boss came to believe that modern medicine and psychology, premised on Cartesian philosophy and Newtonian physics, made incorrect assumptions about human beings and what it means to be human. He addressed an existential foundation for medicine and psychology two classic texts: Psychoanalysis and Daseinsanalysis (English version, 1963) and Existential Foundations of Medicine and Psychology (English translation, 1979).

Whereas Boss's older colleague Ludwig Binswanger, is recognized as the founder of the first systematic existential approach to psychiatry and psychopathology, Boss is regarded as having founded the first systematic approach to existential psychotherapy. Other significant contributions Boss made to the literature in existential psychotherapy include The Meaning and Content of Sexual Perversions (English Translation, 1949), The Analysis of Dreams (English Translation, 1958), and A Psychiatrist Discovers India (English translation, 1965).

Boss saw dreams as coming from a person's life as a whole, not from a separate "dream state". He also did not see the "unconscious" as a place where the denied impulses were kept, which was the way Freud presented it.

== Select bibliography ==
- Zollikon Seminars: Protocols, Conversations, Letters (editor; Martin Heidegger, author) (2001). F. Mayr, trans. Northwestern University Press.
- Existential Foundations of Medicine and Psychology (1979). S. Conway and A. Cleaves, trans. Northvale, NJ: Jason Aronson.
- Psychoanalysis and Daseinsanalysis (1963). L. E. Lefebre, trans. New York: Basic Books.
- A Psychiatrist Discovers India (1965). Wolff.
- I Dreamt Last Night... (1977). S. Conway, trans. New York: Gardner Press.
- The Analysis of Dreams (1957). J. Pomerans, trans. New York: Philosophical Library.
- The Meaning and Content of Sexual Perversions (1949). L. L. Abell, trans. New York: Grune and Stratton.
- Psychotherapy for Freedom: The Daseinsanalytic Way in Psychology and Psychoanalysis. E. Craig (ed.). A Special Issue of The Humanistic Psychologist, Volume 16, Spring, 1988.
