= The Man Who Wouldn't Get Up and Other Stories =

First edition

The Man Who Wouldn't Get Up and Other Stories is the first collection of short stories by David Lodge.

The collection was initially published in 1995 by the Zurich-based publisher Haffmans Verlag entitled Sommergeschichten – Wintermärchen (Summer Stories - Winter Tales) then in 1998 a limited edition was published by his friend Tom Rosenthal at Bridgewater Press, entitled The Man Who Wouldn't Get Up and Other Stories: a more engaging title. The collection contained six stories. In 2016 two further stories were added as were the Foreword, Afterword and 'Hommage to David Lodge' by Philippine Hamen.

== Contents ==
- "Foreword" : The history of the collection is mentioned above. In 2015 an email was exchanged between David Lodge and Philippine, inspired by the title story but she could only find the German translation. Lodge asked Vintage Books if he could add two more recent stories and they agreed and published the collection. Philippine housed the Ikon Gallery in Birmingham where David Lodge and his wife is a patron.
- "The Man Who Wouldn't Get Up" (written in the winter of 1965/66): George struggles to get up in the mornings. But one day he stays in his warm bed, refusing to get up (except with discreet, unobserved visits to the bathroom). The next day the doctor and then the vicar made no impact on him. After a week he got bedsores and after a month a nurse cared for his bodily needs as he became a local and then national celebrity...
- "The Miser" (written in the 1970s for BBC Radio) :After the end of the war Timothy, Drakey and Woppy tried to obtain fireworks leading up to Guy Fawkes Night. Eventually they found a shed advertising fireworks and they purchased all they could. Drakey and Woppy tried out their wares over the coming days, they returned to the shed but it was empty. Timothy hoarded his fireworks until 5 November but the day before a policeman told him that the fireworks were stolen and were required for evidence...
- "My First Job" (1980): A Marxist sociologist recalls his first job at age 17 on Waterloo station in 1952, where he sold newspapers and magazines where he learns about the oppressive power of capitalism...
- "Where the Climate's Sultry" (1987): After university four friends Des, Jo, Rob and Sal go to on holiday to Ibiza in 1955, before the Pill or the Permissive Society, where sex is on their minds, how far can they go?
- "Hotel des Boobs" (1985): A story within a story; Harry and Brenda are on holiday on the Cote D'Azur, where many of the women go topless around the hotel pool, Harry is obsessed with the breasts on display and has negotiating Brenda to uncover. The author is writing the preceding story at the hotel when the wind catches the manuscript and it blows the pages away...
- "Pastoral" (1992): A sixth-former arranges a Catholic Nativity play, he plays Joseph with Dympna Cassidy as Mary. He hopes to kiss her but the parish priest cuts out the scene...
- "A Wedding to Remember" (appeared 2013 in Good Housekeeping): Emma has planned her perfect wedding but then discovers that her fiancé is unfaithful and no longer wants to get married. Emma manages to salvage her plans, hooking up with a 'conceptual poet'...
- "My Last Missis" (appeared Autumn 2015 in Areté): As a homage to "My Last Duchess" by Robert Browning the wealthy protagonist considers the perfect photograph of his wife Viv, before she divorced him...
- "Afterword": Explains the background of the stories.
- "For the Man Who Wouldn't Get Up - Hommage to David Lodge" by Philippine Hamen

== Reception ==
- Carl Wilkinson of the Financial Times found most of the stories positive: 'It may come as something of a surprise that Lodge, now 81, is only now publishing his first collection of eight short stories; he seems so perfectly suited to the form...In fact, there is only one dud here: “My Last Missis”, Lodge's homage to Robert Browning's poem “My Last Duchess”. It rings hollow; a knowing literary exercise in an otherwise brisk, well-observed collection that one wishes was twice as long.
- Andrew Motion in The Guardian has his reservations about the collection: 'They all have an easily comprehended narrative structure, an affably middle-brow tone, an uncomplicated sense of their time and place, and a clear moral (if not quite moralising) and intellectual framework. And they are all, in one way or another, about the same thing. Namely, the way in which people discover and react to the limitations that govern their lives...Yet the mood and message of the stories has very little to do with liberation. On the contrary, even when they are preoccupied by the change in sexual mores that occurred in the 60s, as many of them are, Lodge's characters seem unable to escape a blighted Larkinland where everyone is more or less deceived. Their language retains the beige tint of the mid-century. Their grasp of selfhood is never firm or convincing. It means the book as a whole has a distinctly old-fashioned feel, but also contains an element of bleakness that never goes out of date.'
