= Dramatic Lyrics =

Collection of poems by Robert Browning

Dramatic Lyrics is a collection of English poems by Robert Browning, first published in 1842 as the third volume in a series of self-published books entitled Bells and Pomegranates. It is most famous as the first appearance of Browning's poem The Pied Piper of Hamelin, but also contains several of the poet's other best-known pieces, including My Last Duchess, Soliloquy of the Spanish Cloister, Porphyria's Lover, and Johannes Agricola in Meditation.

== Contents ==
Many of the original titles given by Browning to the poems in this collection, as with its "follow-up" collection Dramatic Romances and Lyrics, are different from the ones he later gave them in various editions of his collected works. Since this book was originally self-published in a very small edition, these poems are now always referred to by their later titles.

The poems were written between 1836 (possibly late 1835) and 1842.

Original titles
Later titles
Cavalier Tunes—
1. Marching Along
2. Give a Rouse
3. My Wife Gertrude
Cavalier Tunes—
1. Marching Along
2. Give a Rouse
3. Boot and Saddle
Italy and France—
1. Italy
2. France
- My Last Duchess
- Count Gismond
Camp and Cloister—
1. Camp (French)
2. Cloister (Spanish)
- Incident of the French Camp
- Soliloquy of the Spanish Cloister
- In a Gondola
- Artemis Prologizes
- Waring
- In a Gondola
- Artemis Prologizes
- Waring
Queen-Worship—
1. Rudel and the Lady of Tripoli
2. Cristina
- Rudel to the Lady of Tripoli
- Cristina
Madhouse Cells—
- Johannes Agricola in Meditation
- Porphyria's Lover
- Through the Metidja to Abd-El-Kadr, 1842
- The Pied Piper of Hamelin
- Through the Metidja to Abd-El-Kadr
- The Pied Piper of Hamelin
