= After Many a Summer =

1939 novel by Aldous Huxley

After Many A Summer or After Many A Summer Dies the Swan
- First UK edition
- Author: Aldous Huxley
- Language: English
- Genre: Philosophical novel
- Publisher: Chatto & Windus (UK); Harper & Row (USA)
- Publication date: 1939
- Publication place: United Kingdom
- Media type: Print (hardback & paperback)
- Pages: 314 (1962 hardback edition)
- ISBN: 0-06-091063-1 (recent hardback edition)
- OCLC: 10092865
- Dewey Decimal: 823/.912 19
- LC Class: PR6015.U9 A77 1983

After Many a Summer (1939) is a novel by Aldous Huxley that tells the story of a Hollywood millionaire who fears his impending death. It was published in the United States as After Many a Summer Dies the Swan. Written soon after Huxley left England and settled in California, the novel is Huxley's examination of American culture, particularly what he saw as its narcissism, superficiality, and obsession with youth. This satire also raises philosophical and social issues, some of which would later take the forefront in Huxley's final novel Island. The novel's title is taken from Tennyson's poem Tithonus, about a figure in Greek mythology to whom Aurora gave eternal life but not eternal youth. The book was awarded the 1939 James Tait Black Memorial Prize for fiction.

== Plot summary ==
Cover of the US mass-market paperback

The action revolves around a few characters brought together by a Hollywood millionaire, Jo Stoyte. Each character represents a different attitude toward life. Stoyte, in his sixties and conscious of his mortality, is desperate to stave off death. Stoyte hires Dr. Obispo and his assistant Pete to research the secrets to long life in carp, crocodiles, and parrots. Jeremy Pordage, an English archivist and literature expert, is brought in to archive a collection of rare books. Pordage's presence highlights Stoyte's shallow attitude toward the precious works of art that he affords himself. Other characters are Virginia, Stoyte's young mistress; and Mr. Propter, a childhood acquaintance of Stoyte's who lives on a small nearby farm and works to improve the lot of the mistreated and underpaid laborers Stoyte has working for him. Mr. Propter believes:

... every individual is called on to display not only unsleeping good will but also unsleeping intelligence. And this is not all. For, if individuality is not absolute, if personalities are illusory figments of a self-will disastrously blind to the reality of a more-than-personal consciousness, of which it is the limitation and denial, then all of every human being's efforts must be directed, in the last resort, to the actualisation of that more-than-personal consciousness. So that even intelligence is not sufficient as an adjunct to good will; there must also be the recollection which seeks to transform and transcend intelligence.

This is essentially Huxley's own position. Though other characters achieve conventional success, even happiness, only Mr. Propter does so without upsetting anyone or creating evil. Propter also says, "Time and craving, craving and time--two aspects of the same thing; and that thing is the raw material of evil." For this reason, he sees any effort to extend human lifespans—the very work that Stoyte had hired Dr. Obispo and Pete to do, as nothing but "a couple of extra lifetimes of potential evil."

Dr. Obispo views science as the ultimate good and is cynical and dismissive of ordinary notions of morality. Because he views himself as a man of science, he has no qualms about deriving pleasure or happiness at others' expense. According to Propter's philosophy, he is trapped in ego-based "human" behavior that prevents him from reaching enlightenment.

One evening, Obispo visits Jeremy, who reads to him from the diaries of the Fifth Earl of Gonister, written in the late eighteenth century. At the time, the Fifth Earl was extremely old and looking into the secrets of long life. He eventually concludes it can be obtained by eating raw fish guts. Obispo is at first skeptical but then realizes the Fifth Earl may be onto something.

Throughout the book, Obispo repeatedly rapes Virginia, which results in Virginia's self-recrimination and feelings of sordid guilt:

It had happened again, even though she’d said no, even though she’d got mad at him, fought with him, scratched him; but he’d only laughed and gone on; and then suddenly she was too tired to fight anymore. Too tired and too miserable. He got what he wanted; and the awful thing was that it seemed to be what she wanted--or rather, what her unhappiness wanted; for the misery had been relieved for a time...

Stoyte senses that Virginia is acting differently and assumes that she is having an affair with Pete, who is the only person Virginia's age living on Stoyte's estate. Stoyte finds out the truth when he witnesses Obispo and Virginia, which results in his getting his revolver with the intention of shooting Obispo. He accidentally kills Pete (whose thoughts and morals had slowly started to expand under Propter's tutelage) instead. Obispo knows Stoyte intended to kill him but covers up the act for money and continued research support. This takes him, along with Virginia and Stoyte, to Europe, where they find the Fifth Earl, now 201 years old and living locked in a dungeon with a female housekeeper, whom he beats. The Fifth Earl and his housekeeper both resemble apes -- "a foetal ape that's had time to grow up," according to Obispo, who sarcastically asks Stoyte if he would like to undergo the treatment. The book concludes with Stoyte's response:

'How long do you figure it would take before a person went like that?' he said in a slow, hesitating voice. 'I mean, it wouldn't happen at once...there'd be a long time while the person...well, you know; while he wouldn't change any. And once you get over the first shock—well, they look like they're having a pretty good time. I mean in their own way, of course. Don't you think so, Dr. Obispo?' he insisted. Dr. Obispo went on looking at him in silence; then threw back his head and started to laugh again.

== Characters ==
- Jeremy Pordage
- Mr. Propter
- Pete
- Dr. Obispo
- Jo Stoyte
- Virginia

== Major themes ==
These characters expose questions and answers depicting their various life philosophies until the climax in a Socratic method, while explorations of mortality, eroticism, class struggle, mysticism, and greed are all presented dispassionately throughout.

The story works scientific knowledge into a more traditional form of narrative. The evolutionary principle of neoteny (a phenomenon of adult retention of juvenile-like morphology or behaviour) has been invoked to explain the origin of human characteristics from ape ancestors. The storyline suggests that if we lived longer, we would continue to develop along the path of an ape and eventually become ape-like. According to Stephen Jay Gould, Huxley got this theme from the 'fetalization theory' proposed by the anatomist Louis Bolk "...and probably transmitted to him by brother Julian, who was doing some important research on delayed metamorphosis in amphibians."

Huxley came from a well-known family of biologists, and his grasp of the principle of neoteny seems to reflect this influence. The story has been interpreted as the British Huxley's contemptuous nod to the Hearstian reality of the United States in the early part of the 20th century: Jo Stoyte is an allegory for William Randolph Hearst by his acquisitions of art, etc., and living in an opulent estate—similar to Hearst Castle—with Virginia, who can be taken as a parody of Marion Davies. Orson Welles may have been inspired by this novel—after RKO Radio Pictures rejected Welles's two earlier ideas for scripts—to write the screenplay for Citizen Kane with Herman Mankiewicz, although their screenplay is very different from the novel.

== Adaptations ==
- NBC University Theater radio adaptation 12 December 1948, starring Paul Henreid and Alan Hale, Sr., with intermission commentary by Norman Cousins
- After Many a Summer (1967), TV movie directed by Douglas Camfield
- In early 2000 the Baryshnikov Dance Foundation commissioned a 35-minute dance for the White Oak Dance Project called After Many a Summer Dies the Swan after Huxley's novel.
- The book is mentioned in the novella and film A Single Man, when George Falconer (Colin Firth) places it in his briefcase alongside an empty pistol and discusses it with his class.

== Release details ==
- UK, Chatto and Windus, 1939, hardback (first edition)
- USA, Harper and Row, 1939, hardback, originally as After Many a Summer Dies the Swan
