= Martti Olavi Siirala =

Finnish psychiatrist, psychoanalyst, and philosopher (1928–2008)

- Born: 24 November 1922; Liperi, Finland
- Died: 18 August 2008 (aged 85); Helsinki, Finland
- Scientific career
- Fields: Philosophy; Psychiatry; Psychology; Psychoanalysis

Martti Olavi Siirala (24 November 1922 – 18 August 2008) was a Finnish psychiatrist, psychoanalyst, and philosopher. He was inspired by psychoanalysis, the anthropological medicine of Viktor von Weizsäcker and the existential philosophy of Martin Heidegger. The outcome was a unique synthesis theory that Siirala called social pathology.

Siirala studied psychoanalysis in Zürich under the guidance of Medard Boss and Gustav Bally. There he met also colleague and lifetime friend Gaetano Benedetti. Siirala was also the founding member of Finnish Therapeia-foundation, an alternative psychoanalytic training institute established 1958. Especially in the early years Siirala was actually the principal of the foundation, both at a theoretical and practical level.

== Anthropological basis ==
In the tradition of philosophical anthropology man is seen as a unity. No sharp distinction is to be seen between body and soul. Also man is seen as member of his society, believing that one needs contacts to others for his own welfare. Siirala accepted these theses, mostly under the influence of von Weiszäcker. Siirala saw human illness as meaningful reactions to the patient's life situations, both present and past. Siirala also considered bodily and mental illnesses as alternative reactions. Mentally ill people he described as placeless, meaning that they have no real place among other men, their acceptance or respect. The origins of problems of this kind Siirala saw as mostly social. Handling children with problems in speech development in Medicine in Metamorphosis, Siirala's attitude comes clear. Here we can think about the symptom of stuttering. From traditional point of view there is child who tries to speak, but some, probably neurological problem disturbs this process. From Siirala's point it is just that this child stutters, speak this way, and he does this as a total reaction of his whole life situation: "A child is born into a family and a national and human network that extends across the generations".

== Social pathology ==
In modern psychiatry there is a tradition of returning patient's illness back to one specific reason. Sometimes this cause is to be found in genetics, sometimes elsewhere. From Siirala's point of view there is not a single cause but rather a net of causes: hence his opposition to what he called 'the delusion that we have reduced diseases to mere object-things, entities that can be studied in isolation...the delusion of reductive reification'. Tracking these causes starts from man, but leads to his social environment, in the end to the whole society. Freud thought psychological symptoms to be overdeterminded. It can be said that Siirala took the idea but expanded it to social field. For some patient we may think maybe of genetic fault or traumatic childhood. But we must think also patients parents childhood, the phenomena of transgenerational transmission, the teachers and social workers who have ignored the problem and so on.

Siirala distinguishes two major factors in this collective pathology. The first is the delusional possession of reality. By that Siirala means an attitude where one's own assumptions are considered the only one, a position where things are already known - so there seems to be no real need to orient towards the subject. Thus for Siirala 'a central feature of the delusions of the healthy seems to be the unconscious assumption that they possess reality, the criteria of what is worth notice'. The second is often latent despair, a hopelessness attitude. These factors can be seen for example in the history of psychiatry. Some decades ago it was already known that schizophrenia is an incurable state or condition. Therefore, no real therapeutic actions were done, and patients stayed ill: a Self-fulfilling prophecy.

Siirala wrote here about transfer, a social pathological formation of non-articulated life. When there is no room to people to react to problems they encounter, it has effects that harm the whole society. However, these transfers or burdens are not delivered equally. On the contrary, they often fall on the shoulders of this or that particular person, who then becomes ill. Here, Siirala maintains, the mentally or physically ill one - the Identified patient - gets ill for his society. In Siirala's view, then, 'many symptoms of schizophrenia may be precipitated by...the people around him, in an attempt to overcome tendencies in him which disturb their view of reality. This, as with many of Siirala's writings, is disturbing and provocative...[but] can never be healthily ignored'. The corollary is that the real subject of illness is not therefore the particular individual who is driven into isolation - "placelessness" - but the society that has driven him there. Siirala has accordingly been linked with figures like Harold Searles or Harry Stack Sullivan in his belief that the delusions of patients are 'expressions that reflect what has been dissociated, hidden, and overlooked in life'. A similar link appears in 'the psychological literature on Invisible Loyalties (Boszormenyi-Nagi & Spark 1973) and anonymous social burdens (Siirala, M. 1983)'.

== Psychotherapy ==
Siirala calls therapy the new, sharing transfer of social burden. The so-called transference of psychoanalysis is seen not only as projecting feelings to the therapist, but also as the sharing of this burden. Thus 'in order to be creative, the therapist must identify himself with the patient, share his sufferings so that he attains his goal'. This may also cause some pain to the therapist, but can at the same time make things happen that are at first sight impossible. Epistemologically Siirala stresses that therapist must keep all possibilities open, and not hang on to some preconceived theory like the oedipal theory of psychoanalysis. In many points Siirala comes close to Ronald David Laing, a famous anti-psychiatrist from the 1960s. The work "Medicine in Metamorphosis" was published originally in a series edited by Laing. Both were interested in social origins of schizophrenia. On the other hand, Siirala never stops considering his patients as ill. Also he sees that they need the right kind of psychiatric treatment to gain again some kind of place among other men.

== See also ==
- Parentification

== Selected bibliography ==
- Die Schizophrenie des Einzelnen und Der Allgemenheit. Wanderhoek & Ruprecht, Göttingen 1961.
- Medicine in metamorphosis. Tavistock, London 1969.
- From Transfer to Transference. Therapeia-Foundation, Helsinki 1983.
