= Tithonus (The X-Files) =

- The X-Files episode
- Alfred Fellig, the metaphorical "Tithonus", takes a picture of a dying Dana Scully. In order to achieve the effect, the film was reverse-film colorized.
- Episode no.: Season 6 Episode 10
- Directed by: Michael W. Watkins
- Written by: Vince Gilligan
- Production code: 6ABX09
- Original air date: January 24, 1999
- Running time: 45 minutes

Guest appearances
- Geoffrey Lewis as Alfred Fellig; Richard Ruccolo as Agent Peyton Ritter; James Pickens, Jr. as Assistant Director Alvin Kersh; Matt Gallini as Hood; Naomi Matsuda as Streetwalker; Ange Billman as Secretary; Barry Wiggins as NYPD Detective; Javier Grajeda as Desk Sergeant; Dell Yount as Truck Driver; Nicky Fane as Blue-Collar Man; Don Fehmel as EMT; Coby Ryan McLaughlin as Young Agent; Jolyon Resse as Second Young Agent

Episode chronology
← Previous "S.R. 819"	Next → "Two Fathers"
- The X-Files season 6

"Tithonus" is the tenth episode of the sixth season of the American science fiction television series The X-Files. It premiered on the Fox network on January 24, 1999. The episode was written by Vince Gilligan, and directed by Michael W. Watkins. The episode is a "Monster-of-the-Week" story, unconnected to the series' wider mythology. "Tithonus" earned a Nielsen household rating of 9.2, being watched by 15.90 million people in its initial broadcast. The episode received positive reviews.

The show centers on FBI special agents Fox Mulder (David Duchovny) and Dana Scully (Gillian Anderson) who work on cases linked to the paranormal, called X-Files. Mulder is a believer in the paranormal, while the skeptical Scully has been assigned to debunk his work. In this episode, Scully learns that she, but not Mulder, is being given a chance to prove her worth at the FBI, and—paired with a new partner—she investigates a crime scene photographer with an uncanny knack for arriving just in time to see his victims' final moments. What she does not expect, however, is for Death to play a role himself.

Vince Gilligan wrote "Tithonus" in an attempt to create a story wherein immortality is portrayed as scary. The episode was based on three different stories: Arthur Fellig, the Greek myth of Tithonus, and the yellow fever epidemic in the 19th century. In addition, several of the scenes were filmed on the sets from NYPD Blue, whose sets were located just across from The X-Files studios. The character of Alfred Fellig in "Tithonus" has thematically been compared to the Tithonus in Alfred, Lord Tennyson's poem of the same name. In addition, themes of immortality and escaping death were revisited in the eighth season episode "The Gift".

== Plot ==
In New York City, a former police photographer named Alfred Fellig follows a woman whose appearance has turned gray to him. After her elevator crashes, he photographs her dead body. FBI Assistant Director Alvin Kersh (James Pickens, Jr.) assigns Dana Scully (Gillian Anderson) and Agent Peyton Ritter to investigate Fellig. Curiously, despite records showing that Fellig worked as a police photographer in 1964, he has not appeared to age in the years since.

After witnessing a murder, Fellig himself is repeatedly stabbed but survives and is brought in for questioning. Fellig denies that he has murdered anyone, despite managing to always be at the scene of crimes. To explain how he is able to do this, he takes Scully out on a nighttime ride, explaining that people who are about to die appear gray to him. He then identifies a prostitute as one such person, and despite Scully's attempt to save her, the woman is struck and killed by a truck, seemingly proving Fellig's claim.

Fellig tells Scully that he is 149 years old and photographs the dying in hopes of capturing a photo of Death so that he can finally die. He explains that while suffering from yellow fever decades earlier, he refused to look Death in the face, and so Death took the life of the nurse caring for him. This left Fellig unable to die. While telling Scully his story, he notices that she has turned gray, indicating that she is now marked for death. Suddenly, Ritter ambushes Fellig and shots him. However, the bullet passes through him and strikes Scully.

As Scully lies critically wounded, Fellig asks her to close her eyes rather than look at Death. The color then returns to Scully while Fellig turns gray: Having taken Scully's place, Fellig is allowed to die, whereas Scully makes a full recovery.

== Production ==
=== Writing ===
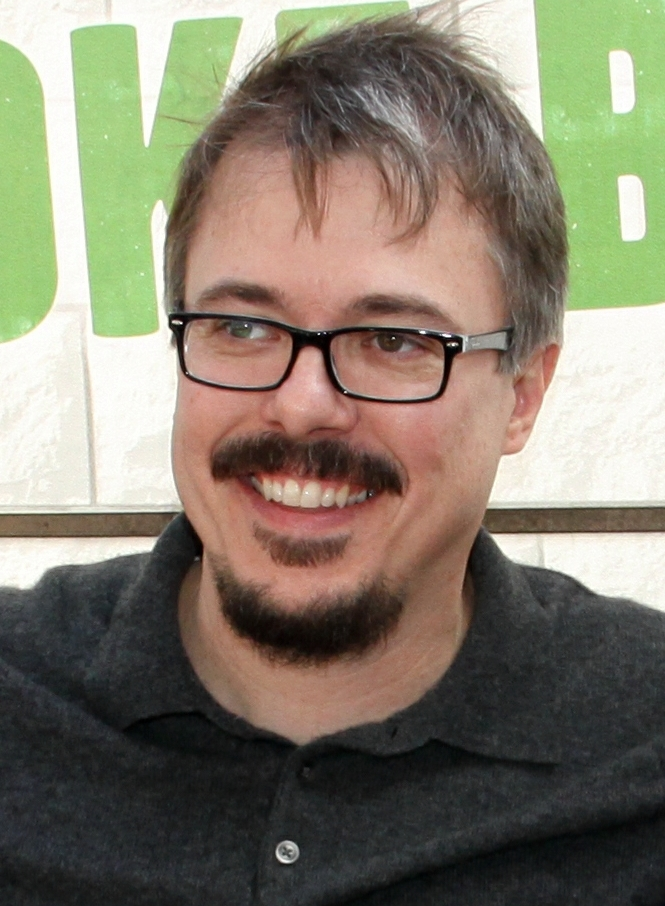
"Tithonus" was written by Vince Gilligan.

An X-Files story about immortality had been discussed by the writers for a number of years, but they always struggled with making the concept "scary". Frank Spotnitz, the show's executive producer, claimed that the breakthrough came when they began contemplating the idea of an immortal photographer trying to catch Death so that he could die. Vince Gilligan was assigned to outline and write "Tithonus", and he took inspiration from three distinct aspects of history and myth. The first of these was the story of Arthur "Weegee" Fellig, a famous photographer, whose name served as the inspiration for Alfred Fellig. The second was the New York yellow fever epidemic in the 19th century. The third and most fantastical inspiration was the Greek myth of Tithonus (to which this episode's title alludes), who was the son of Cephalus and the lover of Eos, Goddess of the Dawn. Eos later kidnapped him to be her lover and asked Zeus to make him immortal. Eos, however, forgot to ask for eternal youth to go with eternal life, resulting in Tithonus living forever but degenerating into a husk of a man.

Because Scully refused to look at Death in the face, just as Fellig had years prior, many fans argued that she had likewise become immortal. This theory, which was especially popular with fans on the internet, was later confirmed by Spotnitz as being true. "Tithonus" was not the first time this idea had been referenced: In the season three episode "Clyde Bruckman's Final Repose", the titular Clyde Burckman, a psychic who can see how people will die, tells Scully that she would not die. Spotnitz was happy that this plot thread could be bookended by "Tithonus", and he called the solution "very satisfying".

=== Filming and effects ===
While the first five seasons of the series were mainly filmed in Vancouver, British Columbia, production of the show's sixth season was based in Los Angeles, California. Several of the scenes for "Tithonus" were shot on the sound stage of NYPD Blue, an ABC program whose sets were just across from the Fox studios.

All of Fellig's cameras were borrowed from the University of California's Museum of Photography, and many of the photographs were used courtesy of the Los Angeles-based advertising and licensing agency Corbis. The production staff of The X-Files was tasked with not only creating the photographs that Fellig takes, but also with ensuring that each looked as if it belonged to a discrete time period. Tom Day, the episode's property master, researched "popular government typefaces and printing technologies" to make the pictures as historically accurate as possible.

The episode featured several special effects. The stab wounds that were on Fellig's back were constructed in "precisely graduated sizes" to show Fellig's healing powers. The faux-wounds were then applied to Lewis' back by make-up department head Cheri Montesanto-Mecalf. Reportedly the effect that caused the most headaches was turning select figures in photos black-and-white. Visual effects producer Bill Millar noted that the process was "very similar to the one used to wreck all those old movies by colorizing them. In fact, it's basically the same, only in reverse". The "painstaking" process involved outlining what needed to be de-colorized. A computer program then completed the job. Millar had previously used the technique on the NBC series Nightmare Cafe in 1992 as well as the 1998 movie Pleasantville.

== Themes ==
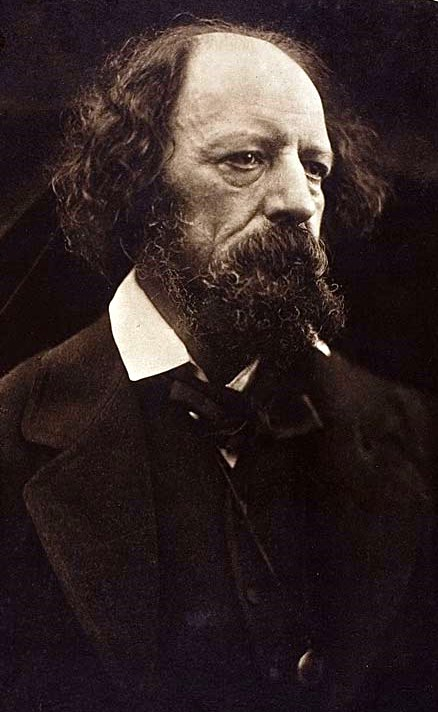
Alfred Fellig has thematically been compared to the Tithonus in Alfred, Lord Tennyson's dramatic monologue of the same name.

Besides a direct reference to the titular mythological character, Matthew VanWinkle, in the chapter "Tennyson's 'Tithonus' and the Exhaustion of Survival in The X-Files", of the book The X-Files and Literature: Unweaving the Story, Unraveling the Lie to Find the Truth, argues that the episode bears a striking resemblance to Alfred, Lord Tennyson's dramatic monologue "Tithonus". In the poem, one line reads "Alas! For this gray shadow, once a man." VanWinkle argues that in The X-Files episode, this line is paralleled by Alfred Fellig's tendency to see those about to die in a monochromatic vision. Furthermore, both the poem and the episode stress that death is not appealing because it is simply "a means to an end". Rather, it is to be sought because it "is the event that most fully unites us with other humans."

VanWinkle compared and contrasted Fellig with Eugene Victor Tooms, from the first season episodes "Squeeze" and "Tooms", and John Barnett, from the first season episode "Young at Heart". While all three are similar in that they have obtained, to a varying degree, elements of immortality, Tooms is different from Fellig because he is a "monstrous predator", and Barnett is unlike Fellig because he is a mere sociopath. Fellig, however, is the only character, out of the three, to possess true immortality. Furthermore, he is separated from Tooms and Barnett due to his distinct hatred for his ability; he did not want to be immortal; rather, it was forced upon him. VanWinkle also notes that Fellig is, furthermore, different from Tennyson's Tithonus because the latter actively sought immortality, due to the flaw of hubris or extreme pride, in order to become more like a god.

In the episode, VanWinkle draws parallels between Scully and Tithonus' lover Aurora. In the end, both will "continue [their] ending and invariable office"—in the former's case, investigating crimes, and in the latter's case, raising the dawn. The themes of immortality and escaping death were later revisited in the eight season episode "The Gift". In the episode, Agent John Doggett, played by Robert Patrick, is looking for clues following Mulder's abduction. Without Scully, he travels to Pennsylvania and seeks out a soul eater: a being that can consume another person's injuries. In the end, Doggett is fatally shot, and the soul eater, wishing to die, consumes Doggett's death. VanWinkle argues that this episode serves as a direct parallel to "Tithonus", although it switches the perspective significantly.

== Broadcast and reception ==
"Tithonus" first aired in the United States on January 24, 1999. This episode earned a Nielsen rating of 9.2, with a 13 share, meaning that roughly 9.2 percent of all television-equipped households, and 13 percent of households watching television, were tuned in to the episode. It was viewed by 15.90 million viewers. The episode aired in the United Kingdom and Ireland on Sky1 on May 9, 1999, and received 0.79 million viewers, making it the third most watched episode that week.

The episode was met with largely positive reviews. Zack Handlen of The A.V. Club wrote positively of the episode and awarded it an "A" grade. He noted the entries' similarities with "Clyde Bruckman's Final Repose", noting that both deal with men "who [know] too much about death for [their] own good". He also praised the characterization of Scully and Fellig; he noted that the former is "no-nonsense" and optimistic, whereas the latter is a "creepy man" who is jealous of those who are capable of dying. Handlen concluded that the episode "doesn’t play out like a classic monster episode, it feels like one". Tom Kessenich, in his book Examination: An Unauthorized Look at Seasons 6–9 of the X-Files wrote positively of the episode, comparing it favorably to "Clyde Bruckman's Final Repose". He wrote, "If imitation is the highest form of flattery, what is a fascinating offshoot of a previous incarnation? I'd say it looks a lot like the latest entry into Season 6 of The X-Files. The engaging 'Tithonus'."

Robert Shearman, in his book Wanting to Believe: A Critical Guide to The X-Files, Millennium & The Lone Gunmen, rated the episode five stars out of five, drawing comparisons to "Clyde Bruckman's Final Repose", but noting that the former has "a flavour all of its own". Shearman praised Geoffrey Lewis' portrayal of Fellig, and described "Tithonus" as "bizarre, chilling, and yet strangely life-affirming". Paula Vitaris from Cinefantastique gave the episode a mixed-to-positive review and awarded it two-and-a-half stars out of four. Vitaris wrote that the episode had a "terrific 'feel'". In addition, Vitaris, despite slightly criticizing Gillian Anderson's "tired" performance through most of the episode, called Anderson's acting in the scene wherein Scully is shot "excellent", citing her "amazement and near-paralysis" as reasons why the scene was a success. The character of Alfred Fellig has also attracted positive critical acclaim. UGO Networks listed him amongst the greatest monster-of-the-week characters in The X-Files.

== Bibliography ==
- Kessenich, Tom (2002). Examination: An Unauthorized Look at Seasons 6–9 of the X-Files. Trafford Publishing. ISBN 1-55369-812-6.
- Meisler, Andy (2000). The End and the Beginning: The Official Guide to the X-Files Season 6. HarperCollins. ISBN 0-06-107595-7.
- Shearman, Robert (2009). Wanting to Believe: A Critical Guide to The X-Files, Millennium & The Lone Gunmen. Mad Norwegian Press. ISBN 978-0-9759446-9-1.
- VanWinkle, Matthew (2007). "Tennyson's 'Tithonus' and the Exhaustion of Survival in The X-Files". In Yang, Sharon (ed.). The X-Files and Literature: Unweaving the Story, Unraveling the Lie to Find the Truth. Cambridge Scholars Publishing. ISBN 9781847182395.
