= Metapsychiatry =

Spiritual form of psychotherapy

Metapsychiatry is a spiritual form of psychotherapy developed by American psychiatrist Thomas Hora (1914–1995) in the second half of the 20th century. Hora described it as "a scientific method of healing and education based on metaphysical concepts of man and the universe". Hora created metapsychiatry because he felt existing psychoanalysis failed to account for human spirituality, and felt that current psychiatric healing was often temporary. It is characterized by a hermeneutic approach.

== Characteristics ==
Metapsychiatry borrows from Judeo-Christian, Zen Buddhist and Taoist religious traditions, along with theistic existentialist philosophy and phenomenology; similarities to Morita therapy have been noted. It makes a distinction between religious practice and spiritual interest. God is perceived as "limitless, infinite and non-material". Its style originates with the assertion that "the meaning and purpose of life are to come to know reality", which is defined as "God", "Love-Intelligence" or "Infinite Mind". The qualities of peace, assurance, gratitude and love (PAGL) are cited as indicating a state of spiritual consciousness.

The study of metapsychiatry includes the implementation of "the two intelligent questions", which seek to distinguish between experiential and spiritual existence. The first question is "What is the meaning of what seems to be?" The second question asks, "What is what really is?" The aim is a reorientation from a preoccupation with material appearances toward the apprehension of spiritual reality.

Metapsychiatry maintains that the problems of humankind are based on ignorance, and may be overcome through "Knowledge of the truth of what really is." Problems are viewed as psychological; answers are spiritual. Metapsychiatry holds that suffering is the product of self-confirmatory thought, the insistence on affirming one's existence, and that relief from suffering is realized through enlightened transcendence of the material world.
