= Daseinsanalysis =

Existentialist approach to psychoanalysis

Daseinsanalysis (German: Daseinsanalyse) is an existentialist approach to psychoanalysis. It was first developed by Ludwig Binswanger in the 1920s under the concept of "phenomenological anthropology". After the publication of "Basic Forms and Perception of Human Dasein" (German: Grundformen und Erkenntnis menschlichen Daseins), Binswanger would refer to his approach as Daseinsanalysis. Binswanger's approach was heavily influenced by the German philosopher Martin Heidegger and psychoanalysis founder Sigmund Freud. The philosophy of Daseinsanalysis is centered on the thought that the human Dasein (Human existence) is open to any and all experience, and that the phenomenological world is experienced freely in an undistorted way. This way initially being absent from meaning, is the basis for analysis. This theory goes opposite to dualism in the way that it proposes no gap between the human mind and measurable matter. Subjects are taught to think in the terms of being alone with oneself and grasping concepts of personhood, mortality and the dilemma or paradox of living in relationship with other humans while being ultimately alone with oneself. Binswanger believed that all mental issues stemmed from the dilemma of living with other humans and being ultimately alone.

After World War II a form of Daseinsanalysis that differed from Binswanger's evolved in Zurich by Medard Boss. This new form of Daseinsanalysis focused on the practical application of Heidegger's phenomenology to the theory of neuroses and psychotherapy. Boss worked closely with Heidegger and in 1957, published a work that directly critiqued Freud, Jung, and Binswanger. While Binswanger refused to institutionalize his "psychiatric Daseinsanalysis" and focused more on research, Boss focused on the psychotherapeutic values and opened the Swiss Society for Daseinsanalysis in 1970 and the Zurich Institute for Daseinsanalytic Psychotherapy and Psychosomatics in 1971. Here, Boss would use Daseinsanalysis as a form of therapy. This therapy focuses on what is obvious and what is immediately experienced. Trying to escape dualistic thinking and to establish a clear connection between body and soul. In this way, Daseinsanalysis is similar in environment to psychoanalysis, but differs in the interpretation of the experience.

== History ==
=== 1920s and Ludwig Binswanger ===
Ludwig Binswanger was a Swiss Psychiatrist and one of the leading minds in the field of existential psychology. In the 1920s, Binswanger worked as the medical director of the sanatorium in Kreuzlingen, Switzerland. Here, Biswanger worked with patients with schizophrenia, melancholy and mania. Heavily influenced by Edmund Husserl, Binswanger believed that lifeworld was the key to understanding a patient's subjective experience. For Binswanger, mental illness involved the remaking of the world in the patient's mind, including alterations in the lived experience of time, space, body sense, and social relationships. Binswanger called this early analytical concept, phenomenological anthropology. While also influenced by Sigmund Freud, Binswanger disagreed with Freud and psychoanalysis that mental illness was caused by a strong attachment to the mother, but rather, that attachment can only exist due to an alteration in the patient's life experience that differs from others. It's important to say "the intention governing Binswanger’s Daseinsanalyse was to understand psychiatric symptoms as the expression of an alteration of the structural components of one’s basic being-in-the-world. To do this, he had to take the ontologically determined existentials of Heidegger and bring them into the frame of concrete human existence (that is, applying the ontological a prioris to the concrete individual)".

=== 1940s ===
As Binswanger continued his research he began to relate his analysis more towards the ideas of Dasein, as popularized and discussed by the philosopher, Martin Heidegger. Binswanger discussed all of his ideas and concepts in his 1942 book, Basic Forms and Perception of Human Dasein (German: Grundformen und Erkenntnis menschlichen Daseins). After the publication of his book, Binswanger referred to his approach as Daseinsanalysis.

=== 1950s–present ===
Ludwig Binswanger was against the idea of institutionalizing his "psychiatric Daseinsanalysis" and focused solely on research. However, Medard Boss, a friend and colleague of both Ludwig Binswanger and Martin Heidegger wanted to take Daseinsanalysis beyond research and turn it into a practical therapy. Initially, Boss was a strong believer in Freudian psychoanalysis, but after World War II, Boss felt that the meta-psychology of psychoanalysis was fundamentally flawed and that Daseinsanalysis was correct. However, in 1957, Boss published a paper that directly criticized not only Freud and his student Jung, but Binswanger as well. This critique lead to a break in the friendship between Boss and Binswanger.

Boss, through his studies with Heidegger, found that modern medicine and psychology, including psychoanalysis and Binswanger's form of Daseinsanlysis made incorrect assumptions on what it means to be human. For Boss and Heidegger, mental illness was not caused by an alternation of a patient's lived experience, but rather a conflict between themselves and the meaning of life and their purpose, or Dasein. Boss felt that psychology had moved away from religion and God. If a patient were to understand and accept religion and God as the answer to their conflict, they would resolve the conflict and the illness would vanish.

In 1970, Boss and fellow psychiatrist, Gion Condrau founded the Swiss Society for Daseinsanalysis and later the Zurich Institute for Daseinsanalytic Psychotherapy and Psychosomatics, which would eventually be known as the Medard Boss Foundation. In 1984 the Swiss Professional Federation for Daseinsanalysis was founded in Zurich.

== Daseinsanalytical therapy ==
=== Theory and division from psychoanalysis ===
One of the pivotal claims that daseinsanalytical therapy holds to be true is that there is no objective way to explain the openness of the human dasein. The only way to look at it is through the 'partial phenomena' that it experiences. This is one of the first divergences with psychoanalysis because psychoanalysis attempts to define the human condition with constructs like instincts and libido. This avoidance of constructs to define patients is what sets daseinsanalysis apart from psychoanalysis. This theory allows a daseinanalysist to be an objective therapist; therapeutically avoiding bringing previous prejudice into sessions and allowing the analysis to be individualized and not generalized. Boss asserts this freeness in therapy allows daseinsanalysis to become an 'analysis of resistance'. This means that the patient is constantly confronted with the perceived limitations of his own existence and is pushed to the point of rejecting the limitations they are placing upon themselves. The human dasein cannot see these limitations from within itself and needs to be exposed to the freedoms beyond the limitations. Another assertion of daseinsanalytical thinking is that a person's subjective experience is the one that truly matters. A therapist should never contradict the phenomenon that their patient is experiencing. The 'phenomenological world' as Binswanger put it is the bread and butter for getting to the bottom of conflict within the human dasein. This approach takes out the complications that psychotherapy brings by lathering the manifest content of the patient's existence with latent meaning. Boss explains that this puts unnecessary stress and anxiety onto the patient and covers the true limitations that the patient is feeling within themselves. The main drive in daseinsanalytical therapy is to make a person's phenomenological world transparent. This transparency leaves the general construct of the original dasein intact so as to not have to rebuild a person's being. This construct is then used to be the foundation to analyze the phenomenological world and fix the problems around the already existing existence.

=== Asking 'why not' versus 'why' ===
Another way that daseinsanalysis points away from latent content is the question of 'why not' that is asked to patients over the question of 'why'. The question of 'why' someone does or thinks something can be misleading and assumes that events and thoughts in a person's life are causal to the patient's obstacles; further, it only grasps at the meaning behind a behavior and not the root cause. Daseinanalytical thought rejects this notion and asks rather 'why not'. Why not leads the therapist to challenge those self-imposed limitations as stated earlier and facilitate a line of logic that is not explanatory, but probing of new thinking. Boss warns against forcing clients to be explanatory before they can properly illustrate why they do or say what they do. This rejects that causal relationship by proposing to the client the thought that they can change. This change can happen independent of the events and behaviors that have happened, and allow the therapist to try to make the client think "why can't I free myself?". A premature explanation of an event or behavior will remove all significance and place an identity-splice onto the client. This means that the client will have to remove themselves from the much needed experience and become absent of it to define it. The example Boss uses is a story of a woman compelled to kneel during a psychoanalytic session. The therapist stopped her and asked why she was doing that when in fact the therapist should have tried to understand the cause of that behavior.

=== Modes of Being ===
Another change from psychotherapy is the avoidance of defined modes of being that can be used to easily label individuals. In Daseinsanalytical thinking, there are thousands of modes of being that make up each human Dasein (existence), but only one overarching fundamental nature of that Dasein. The example Boss uses to help people understand this is that there are thousands of different types of common tables, but they all are of the same type of existence because they are all fundamentally labelled as a 'table'. This mode of existence in daseinanalytical thinking is primarily guilty. This guilt rises from the fact that every choice comes to be at the rejection of the moratorium of other choices that could have been made. The human Dasein is open to all experience, where the body can only experience one thing at a time. This puts the human body at a 'debt' to the Dasein, leading to the guilt. This guilt can only be handled acknowledging and accepting this debt as the fact that not all experiences may be had. This accepting is also the point where a person reaches their full potential of truly living in the world. They become unbound in the sense that they do not have to serve their own egos and consciences. Experience will become illuminated into 'genuine being' and be experienced to its fullest content.

=== Dream analysis ===
Daseinsanalytical analysis of dreams is focused solely on the phenomenological content of the dream being analyzed. This means that experiences in a dreaming state do not signify things beyond their face value, using the phenomenological content to interpret the meaning of that dream. In terms of psychoanalysis, daseinsanalytical dream interpretation focuses on the manifest content experienced by the dreamer, rejecting the latent content of supposed significance placed upon the manifest content. The reason that meaning is not imposed on the manifest experienced content is because it is yet another construct that limits the patient in their understanding of themselves. In Daseinsanalysis, the dream state of an individual is thought of as a continuation of our waking state and needs to be considered real because the human Dasein is expressing what is 'shining forth' inside it. The dream state is equally real to the waking state and thus the phenomenological content is taken at face value. Because this dream state is an autonomous state of human existence, daseinsanalytical therapy can submit the dream content to the same 'analysis of resistance' that normal being-in-the-world therapy does. This means that the therapist tries to challenge the self-imposed limitations and barriers that the dreamer is putting upon themselves in order to allow a free relationship with their own dream world, which is the overall goal of Daseinsanalysis. Daseinsanalysis coincides with psychoanalysis in the fact that the phenomenological experience of the dream world are experiences of the dasein that hasn't been brought to light in the waking realm of thinking. In this way, dreams can be thought to be of great value into understanding a patient beyond the waking state experiences of that patient.

== See also ==
- Existential therapy
- Szondi Schicksalsanalyse (fate analysis) and the Szondi test
