= Tithonus (poem) =

1860 poem written by Alfred, Lord Tennyson

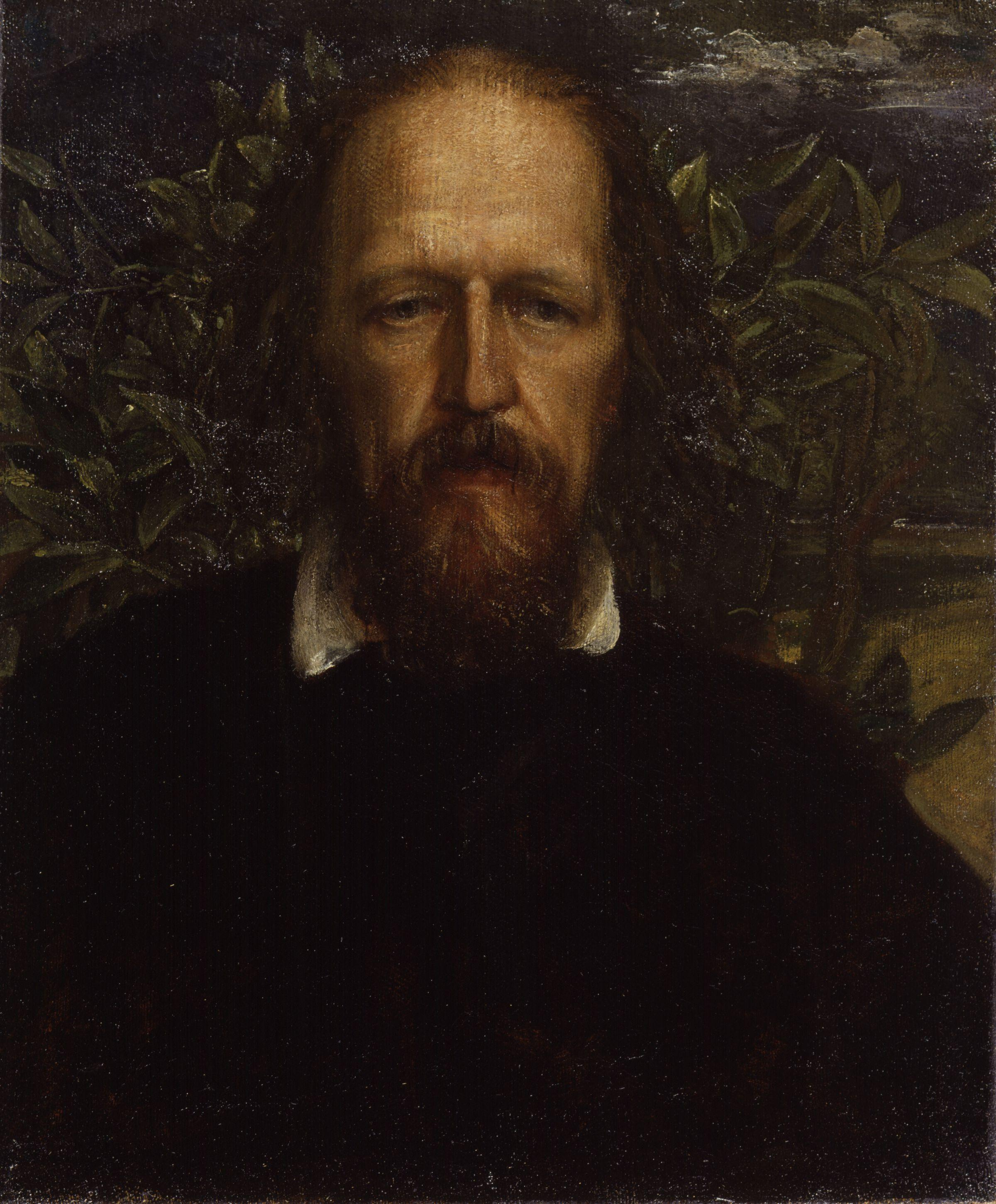
Alfred, Lord Tennyson, author of "Tithonus".

"Tithonus" is a poem by the Victorian poet Alfred, Lord Tennyson (1809–92), originally written in 1833 as "Tithon" and completed in 1859. It first appeared in the February edition of the Cornhill Magazine in 1860. Faced with old age, Tithonus, weary of his immortality, yearns for death. The poem is a dramatic monologue with Tithonus addressing his lover Eos, the goddess of the dawn.

== Overview ==
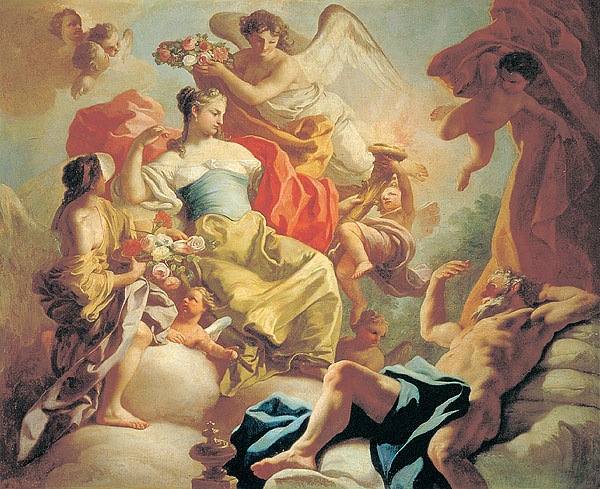
Aurora e Titone by Francesco de Mura. Aurora was the Roman equivalent of Eos and often substitutes for her as Tithonus's lover.

In Greek mythology, Tithonus was a Trojan by birth, the son of King Laomedon of Troy by a water nymph named Strymo ("harsh"). Eos, the Greek goddess of the dawn, abducted Ganymede and Tithonus from the royal house of Troy to be her consorts. When Zeus stole Ganymede from her to be his cup-bearer, as a repayment, Eos asked for Tithonus to be made immortal, but forgot to ask for eternal youth. Tithonus indeed lived forever but grew ever older. In later tellings, Eos eventually turned him into a cricket to relieve him of such an existence. In the poem however, it is Eos, and not Zeus, who grants Tithonus immortality.

In the poem, Tithonus asks Eos for the gift of immortality, which she readily grants him, but forgets to ask for eternal youth along with it. As time wears on, age catches up with him. Wasted and withered, Tithonus is reduced to a mere shadow of himself. But since he is immortal, he cannot die and is destined to live forever, growing older and older with each passing day.

The main classical source that Tennyson draws upon is from the story of Aphrodite's relationship with Anchises in the ancient Homeric Hymn to Aphrodite. In this Aphrodite briefly tells of Eos's foolishness in neglecting to ask Zeus for immortal youth for Tithonus along with his immortality.

The original version of the poem, named "Tithon", was written in 1833 shortly after Tennyson's friend Arthur Henry Hallam's death but was not published. When William Makepeace Thackeray asked him for a submission to the Cornhill Magazine to be issued in January 1860 which he was editing, Tennyson made some substantial revisions to the text of the poem and submitted it under the title "Tithonus". It was published in the February edition. It was finally published by Tennyson in an anthology in the Enoch Arden volume in 1864.

== Synopsis and structure ==
The poem begins with Tithonus speaking to Eos "at the quiet limit of the world" (line 7) where he lives with her. Confronted with old age and its attendant pains, he meditates upon death and mortality, and mourns the fact that death cannot release him from his misery. He recounts how Eos, choosing him to be her lover, had filled him with so much pride that he had seemed "To his great heart none other than a God!" (14). Though she carelessly granted him immortality at his asking, he could not escape the ravages of time. The Hours aged him and his youth and beauty faded away−-"But thy strong Hours indignant work'd their wills / And beat me down and marr'd and wasted me" (18–19). He asks Eos to set him free−-"Let me go; take back thy gift" (27)−-and questions why anyone should desire that which is unattainable.

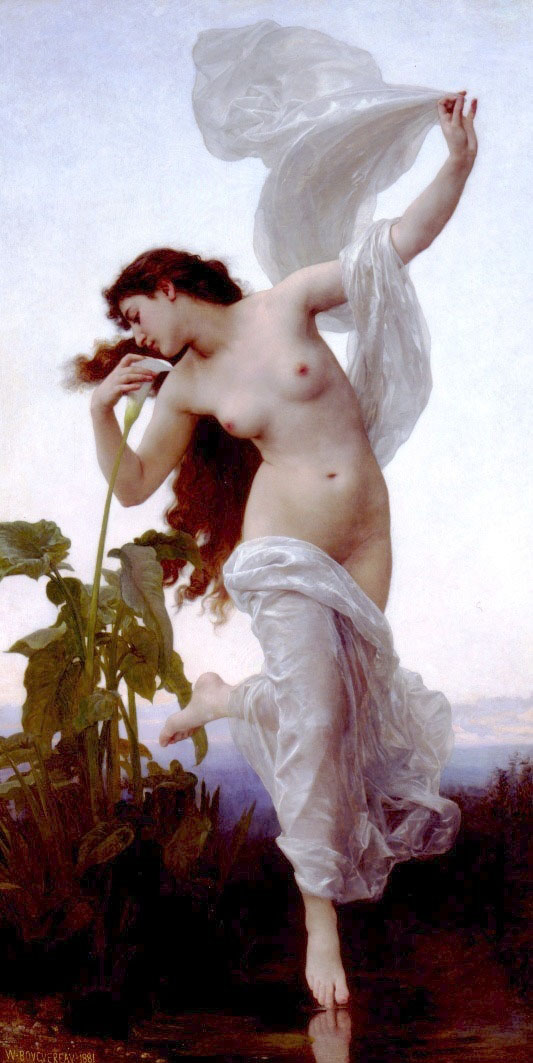
Dawn (1881) by William-Adolphe Bouguereau. Eos was the Greek goddess of the dawn.

Eos departs at dawn without replying to his wish that she take back the boon of immortality. As she leaves, her tears fall on his cheek. This fills him with the foreboding that the saying he had learnt on earth, that even "The Gods themselves cannot recall their gifts"(49), might be true. He remembers his youth when he would feel his whole body come alive at dawn as Eos kissed him and whispered to him words "wild and sweet" (61), which seemed like the song Apollo sang as Ilion (Troy) was being built. In the final section, weary of life and immortality, he yearns for death to take him. He feels that "men that have the power to die" (70) are happy and fortunate. Since his "immortal age" (22) can no longer be reconciled with Eos' "immortal youth" (22), he once more begs her:

Release me, and restore me to the ground;
Thou seest all things, thou wilt see my grave:
Thou wilt renew thy beauty morn by morn;
I earth in earth forget these empty courts,
And thee returning on thy silver wheels. (72–76)

== Interpretations ==
The first version of "Tithonus" was one of four poems ("Morte d'Arthur", "Ulysses", and "Tiresias") which were written by Tennyson following the death of his friend, Arthur Henry Hallam. His death greatly influenced much of Tennyson's later poetry. According to critic Mary Donahue, "It is not that anything so obvious and simple as the identification of Eos with Hallam is possible or that the emotional relationship between Tennyson and Hallam is wholly clarified by 'Tithonus', but it is clear that, in choosing the mask of Tithonus, Tennyson reached out to two of the most basic symbols, those of love between man and woman and the frustration of love by age, to express the peculiar nature of his own emotional injury." Victorian scholar Matthew Reynolds wrote, "Grieving for Arthur Hallam, Tennyson wrote poems which describe what they themselves possess: a life unusually, but not eternally, prolonged through time."

Tithonus's suffering is a reminder of the futility of attempting to "pass beyond the goal of ordinance" (30). It is a poignant expression of the inevitability of death and of the necessity of accepting it as such. Tithonus has to bear the consequences of varying from "the kindly race of men" (29). Though he succeeds in defying death, his youth and beauty desert him in his old age. He can only ask for release. But death does not come to him later even when he begs for it. He is destined to live forever as a "white-haired shadow" (8) and forever roam "the ever-silent spaces of the East" (9). In being immortal, Tithonus ceases to be himself, sacrifices his mortal identity.

Tennyson described "Tithonus" in a letter as "a pendent to the "Ulysses" in my former volumes." Tithonus's character offers a strong contrast to that of Ulysses. The two poems are matched and opposed as the utterances of Greek and Trojan, victor and vanquished, hero and victim. According to critic William E. Cain, "Tithonus has discovered the curse of fulfillment, of having his carelessly worded wish come true. He lives where no man ought to live, on the other side of the horizon, the other side of the border that Ulysses could only plan to cross.

According to Victorian scholar A. A. Markley, "Tithonus" offers a viewpoint opposite to that of "Ulysses" on the theme of the acceptance of death. He writes that "while 'Ulysses' explores the human spirit that refuses to accept death, 'Tithonus' explores the human acceptance of the inevitability, and even the appropriateness, of death as the end of the life cycle. The two poems offer two extreme views of facing death, each one which balances the other when they are read together− clearly one of Tennyson's original intentions when he first drafted them in 1833. Nevertheless, reading 'Tithonus' purely as a pendant to 'Ulysses' has led to unnecessarily reductive readings of both poems."

== Legacy ==
The title of After Many a Summer, a novel by Aldous Huxley originally published in 1939 and retitled After Many a Summer Dies the Swan when published in the US, is taken from the fourth line of the poem. It tells the story of a Hollywood millionaire who, fearing his impending death, employs a scientist to help him achieve immortality.

A season 6 episode of The X-Files entitled "Tithonus" tells the story of a man cursed with immortality who works as a photographer taking photos of individuals whom he can sense are close to death. He snaps these photos hoping to see the Grim Reaper and to die, finally, after having spent decades trapped in the land of the living.

The character of Max Schreck quotes a passage from the poem in the film Shadow of the Vampire.

== Bibliography ==
- Tennyson, Hallam. Alfred Lord Tennyson: A Memoir by His Son. Kessinger Publishing, 1899. ISBN 0-7661-8373-4
- Campbell, Matthew. Rhythm & Will in Victorian Poetry. Cambridge University Press, 1999. ISBN 0-521-64295-7
