= Thomas Hora =

American physician (1914–1995)

Thomas Hora (January 25, 1914 – October 30, 1995) is an American psychiatrist. He is considered the founder of the discipline of metapsychiatry, an attempt to integrate principles from metaphysics, spirituality, and psychology.

== Education and early practice ==
After growing up in northern Hungary, Hora received medical degrees from Royal Hungarian University in Budapest in 1942, and from Charles University in Prague, Czechoslovakia in 1945. He performed his residency in psychiatry at Budapest General Hospital and Karlovy Vary City Hospital in Karlovy Vary, Czechoslovakia. In 1952, Hora established private practices in New York City and in Bedford Village, New York. For the next fifteen years, he was active in professional psychiatric circles in the U.S. and in Europe, and published several articles. In 1958, in recognition of his contributions to his field, he received the Karen Horney Award for the Advancement of Psychoanalysis.

== Development of metapsychiatry ==
However, at about this time, Hora was inspired to look for alternative solutions to psychological problems and life issues. Dissatisfied with orthodox treatments for mental illness, he investigated alternate cures and treatments, soon leading him to spiritual literature. Hora is described as having read the sacred texts and major writings of many major world religions, including Zen Buddhism, Christianity, Taoism, and Judaism. In addition to the literature of the world's major religions, Hora also read from an extensive list of philosophers, both existentialist and classical. He is also said to have met with Carl Jung, Alan Watts and a Zen master to ask questions and seek guidance, incorporating many of their thoughts into his work. The teachings of Jesus became especially important to Hora's formulation of metapsychiatry, and many of his books (such as Beyond the Dream: Discourses on Metapsychiatry and Spiritual Guidance (ISBN 0-913105-14-7)) drew heavily from Jesus' teachings. Hora continued to teach and provide mentorship until shortly before his death on October 30, 1995. His teachings continue to be promulgated through the PAGL (Peace, Assurance, Gratitude, and Love) Foundation, which continues to publish his works.
