= Soliloquy of the Spanish Cloister =

"Soliloquy of the Spanish Cloister" is a soliloquy written by Robert Browning, first published in his collection Dramatic Lyrics (1842). It is written in the voice of an unnamed Spanish monk. The poem consists of nine eight-line stanzas and is written in trochaic tetrameter. The plot of the poem centers around the speaker's hatred for "Brother Lawrence", a fellow monk in the cloister.

The speaker notes the trivial ways in which Brother Lawrence fails in his Christianity, and then plots to murder, or damn the soul of, Brother Lawrence. However, the poem ends before the speaker can finish, when he is interrupted by the bells proclaiming it is time for vespers.
