= My Last Duchess =

1842 poem by Robert Browning

- by Robert Browning
- Original title: Italy
- First published in: Dramatic Lyrics
- Language: English
- Subject: Lucrezia de' Medici, Duchess of Ferrara
- Genre: Historical
- Form: Dramatic monologue
- Meter: Heroic couplets
- Publication date: 1842
- Lines: 56

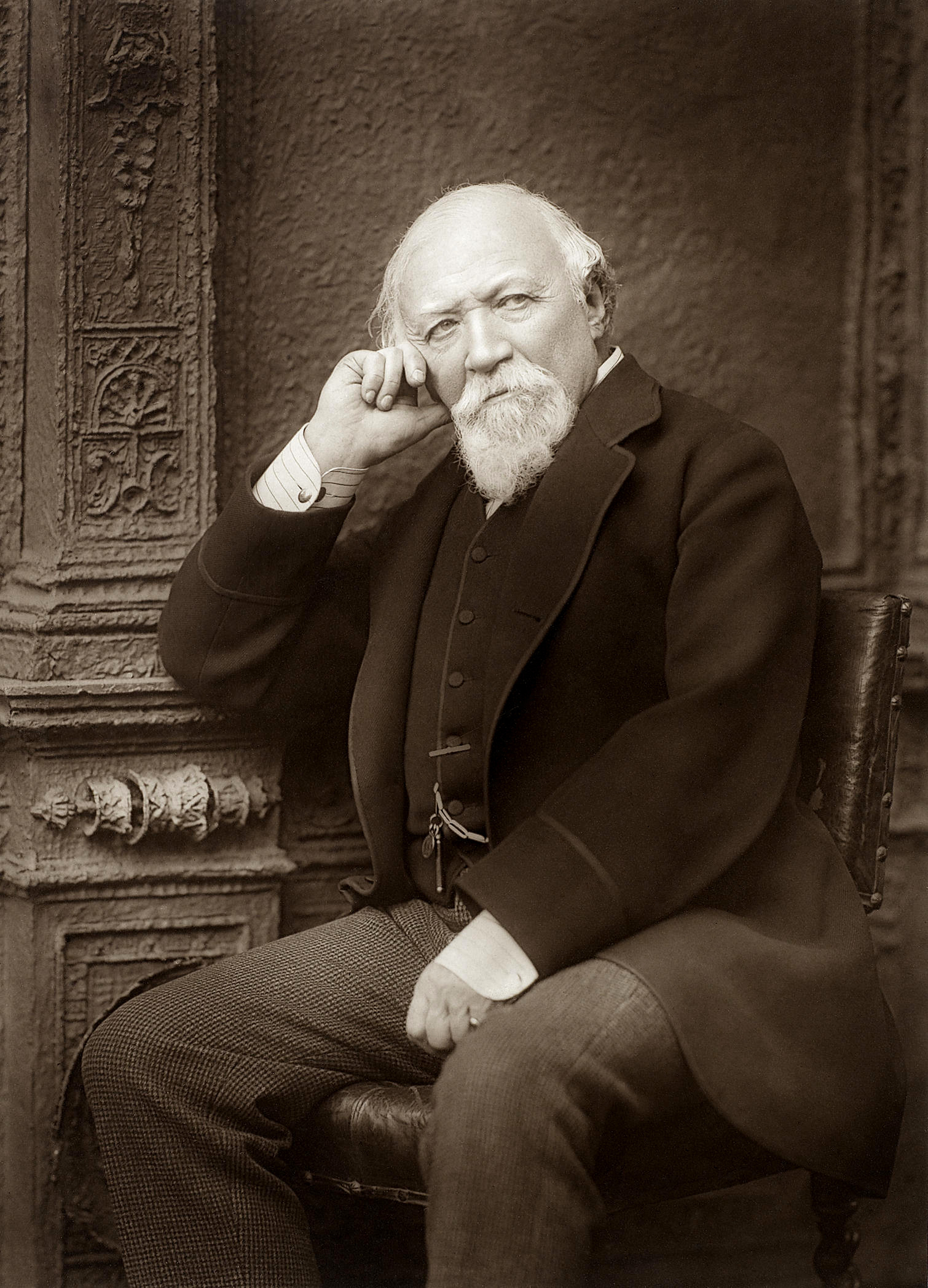
Robert Browning, who wrote the poem.

"My Last Duchess" is a poem by Robert Browning, frequently anthologised as an example of the dramatic monologue. It first appeared in 1842 in Browning's Dramatic Lyrics. The poem is composed in 28 rhyming couplets of iambic pentameter (heroic couplet).

In the first edition of Dramatic Lyrics, the poem was merely titled "Italy".

== Historical background ==
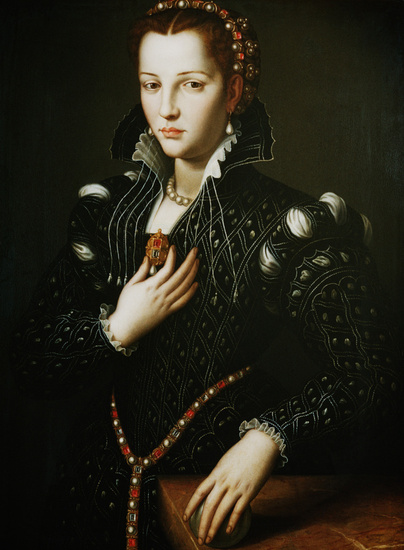
Lucrezia de' Medici by Bronzino or Alessandro Allori, generally believed to be the subject of the poem

The poem is preceded by the epigraph "Ferrara:", indicating that the speaker is Alfonso II d'Este, the fifth Duke of Ferrara (1533–1598), who, in 1558 (at the age of 24), had married Lucrezia di Cosimo de' Medici, the 13-year-old daughter of Cosimo I de' Medici, Grand Duke of Tuscany, and Eleonora di Toledo.

Lucrezia was well-educated, and the Medicis could be considered "nouveau riche" in comparison to the venerable and distinguished Este family (Alfonso II d'Este's remark regarding his gift of a "nine-hundred-years-old name" clearly indicates that he considered his bride beneath him socially). She came with a sizeable dowry. He then abandoned her for two years before she died on 21 April 1561, at age 16. Although there was a strong suspicion of poisoning, it is more likely that the cause of her death was tuberculosis. It is speculated that the rumour of poisoning was started by enemies of Alfonso II.

The Duke then, in 1564, sought the hand of Barbara, eighth daughter of the Holy Roman Emperor Ferdinand I and Anna of Bohemia and Hungary and the sister of the Count of Tyrol, Ferdinand II. The count was in charge of arranging the marriage; the chief of his entourage, Nikolaus Madruz, a native of Innsbruck, was his courier. Madruz is presumably the person addressed by the duke in the poem.

The artists named in the poem – painter Frà Pandolf and sculptor Claus of Innsbruck – are fictional, however Frà Pandolf is likely inspired by the Italian early-renaissance painter, Fra Angelico.

== Synopsis ==
The speaker (presumably the Duke Alfonso of Ferrara) is giving the emissary of the family of his prospective new wife a tour of the artworks in his home. He draws a curtain to reveal a painting of a woman, explaining that it is a portrait of his late wife; he invites his guest to sit and look at the painting. As they look at the portrait of the late Duchess, the Duke describes her happy, cheerful, appreciative and kind nature, which had displeased him.

He says, "She had a heart – how shall I say? – too soon made glad..." He goes on to say that his complaint of her was that "'twas not her husband's presence only" that made her happy. Eventually, "I gave commands; then all smiles stopped together." In an interview, Browning said, "I meant that the commands were that she should be put to death ... Or he might have had her shut up in a convent." The duke now keeps her painting hidden behind a curtain that only he is allowed to draw back, thus now she only smiles for him.

The Duke demonstrates many narcissistic tendencies as he recalls the time he shared with his now-deceased Duchess. He then resumes an earlier conversation regarding wedding arrangements, and in passing points out another work of art, a bronze statue of Neptune taming a sea-horse by Claus of Innsbruck, making his late wife just another work of art.

The envoy remains silent throughout the Duke's discourse and revelations.

== Form ==
Browning characterized this poem as a dramatic lyric; but essentially it is a dramatic monologue, a genre typically associated with Browning, where one person speaks to a presumed audience. It is written in iambic pentameter, employing rhyming couplets and the enjambment technique of not always concluding the sentences at the ends of lines. Because of these techniques, the poem has an intimate conversational quality and can be read as a long speech directed between the reader and the speaker exclusively.

== Modern adaptations ==
- In 1941, while attending Bowdoin College, novelist Charles Mergendahl was awarded first prize in the school's annual one-act play competition for his blank-verse dramatization of the poem.
- The 20th-century American poet Richard Howard wrote a sequel to the poem, "Nikolaus Mardruz [sic] to his Master Ferdinand, Count of Tyrol, 1565", in the form of a letter from the listener in Browning's original that details his response to the Duke's monologue.
- The short story "My Last Girlfriend" by Robert Barnard is a take-off on "My Last Duchess" with a new twist.
- Science fiction author Eric Flint uses portions of "My Last Duchess" in his book 1634: The Galileo Affair (2004).
- In Lemony Snicket's novel The Grim Grotto (2004), alterations to "My Last Duchess" are used as a code to spell out "Duchess R.", an unseen character.
- Canadian author Margaret Atwood's short story "My Last Duchess" appears in her short story anthology Moral Disorder (2006). It is about two high school students who study the poem and argue about its meaning.
- South African author Judy Croome based the main character Rax-ul-Can in her apocalyptic short story "The Last Sacrifice" (published in The Weight of a Feather and Other Stories, Aztar Press, 2013) on the Duke in Browning's "My Last Duchess".
- In "The Painter", a song by Chris de Burgh, the lyrics also take the Duke's point of view, but show a less stable mindset than the original poem.
- Historical novel His Last Duchess by Gabrielle Kimm is based upon the events narrated in the poem.
- "The Marriage Portrait" by Maggie O'Farrell also expands on the framework provided by Browning.
- "My Last Missis" is a short story by David Lodge forming part of his contemporary collection The Man Who Wouldn't Get Up and Other Stories. The narrator is a crass and wealthy businessman whose wife died suddenly just before he was obliged to surrender half of his assets to her as part of a divorce settlement. A society photograph substitutes for Browning's portrait.
- The interactive fiction game "The Spectators" by Amanda Walker adapts the poem into a playable narrative with five characters ancillary to the duke and duchess witnessing the abusive nature of their relationship.
