= Dramatic monologue =

Type of poetry

Dramatic monologue is a type of poetry written in the form of a speech of an individual character. M.H. Abrams notes the following three features of the dramatic monologue as it applies to poetry:

1. The single person, who is patently not the poet, utters the speech that makes up the whole of the poem, in a specific situation at a critical moment […].
2. This person addresses and interacts with one or more other people; but we know of the auditors' presence, and what they say and do, only from clues in the discourse of the single speaker.
3. The main principle controlling the poet's choice and formulation of what the lyric speaker says is to reveal to the reader, in a way that enhances its interest, the speaker's temperament and character.

== Types of dramatic monologue ==
One of the most important influences on the development of the dramatic monologue is Romantic poetry. However, the long, personal lyrics typical of the Romantic period are not dramatic monologues, in the sense that they do not, for the most part, imply a concentrated narrative. Poems such as William Wordsworth's Tintern Abbey and Percy Bysshe Shelley's Mont Blanc, to name two famous examples, offered a model of close psychological observation and philosophical or pseudo-philosophical inquiry described in a specific setting. The conversation poems of Samuel Taylor Coleridge are perhaps a better precedent. The genre was also developed by Felicia Hemans and Letitia Elizabeth Landon, beginning in the latter's case with her long poem The Improvisatrice.

The novel and plays have also been important influences on the dramatic monologue, particularly as a means of characterization. Dramatic monologues are a way of expressing the views of a character and offering the audience greater insight into that character's feelings. Dramatic monologues can also be used in novels to tell stories, as in Mary Shelley's Frankenstein, and to implicate the audience in moral judgements, as in Albert Camus' The Fall and Mohsin Hamid's The Reluctant Fundamentalist.

== Examples ==
The Victorian period represented the high point of the dramatic monologue in English poetry.

- Alfred, Lord Tennyson's Ulysses, published in 1842, has been called the first true dramatic monologue. After Ulysses, Tennyson's most famous efforts in this vein are Tithonus, The Lotos-Eaters, and St. Simon Stylites, all from the 1842 Poems; later monologues appear in other volumes, notably Idylls of the King.
- Matthew Arnold's Dover Beach and Stanzas from the Grand Chartreuse are famous, semi-autobiographical monologues. The former, usually regarded as the supreme expression of the growing scepticism of the mid-Victorian period, was published along with the latter in 1867's New Poems.
- Robert Browning produced his most famous work in this form. While My Last Duchess is the most famous of his monologues, the form dominated his writing career. The Ring and the Book, Fra Lippo Lippi, Caliban upon Setebos, Soliloquy of the Spanish Cloister and Porphyria's Lover, as well as the other poems in Men and Women are just a handful of Browning's monologues.

Other Victorian poets also used the form. Dante Gabriel Rossetti wrote several, including Jenny and The Blessed Damozel; Christina Rossetti wrote a number, including The Convent Threshold. Augusta Webster's A Castaway, Circe, and The Happiest Girl in the World, Amy Levy's Xantippe and A Minor Poet, and Felicia Hemans's Arabella Stuart and Properzia Rossi are all exemplars of this technique. Algernon Charles Swinburne's Hymn to Proserpine has been called a dramatic monologue vaguely reminiscent of Browning's work. Some American poets have also written poems in the genre—famous examples include Edgar Allan Poe's "The Raven".

Post-Victorian examples include William Butler Yeats's The Gift of Harun al-Rashid, Elizabeth Bishop's Crusoe in England, and T.S. Eliot's The Love Song of J. Alfred Prufrock and Gerontion.

== Studies ==
A major study of the dramatic monologue was published in 1977 by Alan Sinfield.

== See also ==
- Stream of consciousness
- Monologue
- Persona poetry
- Soliloquy
- Verse drama and dramatic verse
- Thematic focus of Robert Browning's poetic work

== Sources ==
- Howe, Elisabeth A. (1996). The Dramatic Monologue. Boston: Twayne Publishers. pp. 166 pages. ISBN 0-8057-0969-X.
- Byron, Glennis (2003). Dramatic monologue. New York: Routledge. pp. 208 pages. ISBN 0-415-22937-5.
- Arco Publishing (2002). Arco Master the Ap English Language & Composition Test 2003 (Master the Ap English Language & Composition Test). New York: Arco. pp. 288. ISBN 0-7689-0991-0.
