= Love Among the Ruins =

Love Among the Ruins may refer to:

== Literature ==
- "Love Among the Ruins" (poem), a poem by Robert Browning
- Love Among the Ruins. A Romance of the Near Future, a novel by Evelyn Waugh
- Love Among the Ruins, a novel by Warwick Deeping
- Love Among the Ruins, a novel by Robert Clark
- Love Among the Ruins, a novel by Angela Thirkell
- Love Among the Ruins, a play by Elmer Rice

== Other media ==
- Love Among the Ruins (film), a 1975 TV movie starring Katharine Hepburn and Laurence Olivier
- Love Among the Ruins (album), an album by 10,000 Maniacs, or the title song
- Love Among the Ruins (Burne-Jones), a painting by Edward Burne-Jones
- "Love Among the Ruins", an episode of the TV series Mad Men
- "Love Among the Ruins", a song by Peter Sarstedt
- "Love Among the Ruins", an E.R. episode

== See also ==
- Love in the Ruins, a novel by Walker Percy
