= Thematic focus of Robert Browning's poetic work =

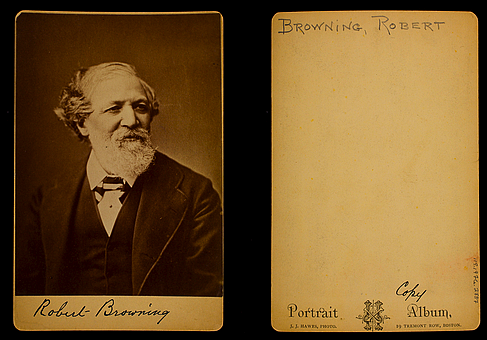
Robert Browning, daguerreotype by Josiah Johnson Hawes (1808–1901)

The thematic focus of Robert Browning's poetic work (1812–1889) addresses universal questions about humanity's relationship with God, art, nature, and love. During an era when longstanding certainties were being challenged by advances in science (geology, Darwinism) and philosophy (scientism, positivism), Robert Browning was often regarded as a philosopher or prophet at the end of the 19th and the beginning of the 20th century.

However, Browning himself saw himself as a poet, a view later validated by posterity, as he is now recognized alongside Tennyson and Matthew Arnold as one of the three great English poets of the Victorian era.

Recurring themes are revisited across Browning's collections, particularly in major works such as Dramatic Lyrics, Dramatic Romances and Lyrics, Men and Women (considered the masterpiece of his middle years by Margaret Drabble), Dramatis personae, and The Ring and the Book. To explore these themes, Browning employed the technique of the dramatic monologue, where a speaker addresses a silent but active listener. This technique reveals a situation, often in a state of crisis, and exposes conflicts among one or more protagonists, leading to resolutions that are frequently dramatic or tragic.

Browning entrusted the exploration of his themes to characters who expressed themselves in their voices. Therefore, each character became a mask through which the poet explored different facets of reality. Browning's aim, as he stated, was to uncover "truth, refracted through its prismatic hues."

== The voice in his work ==
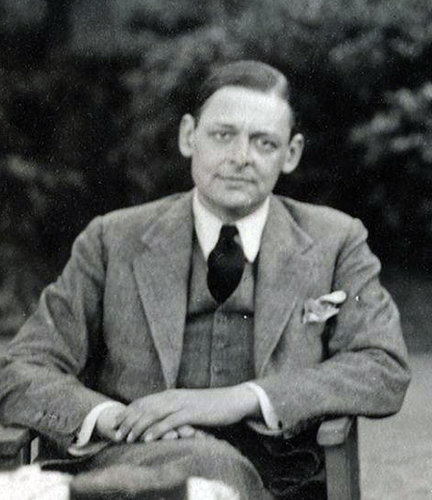
T. S. Eliot in 1934, photograph by Lady Ottoline Morrell.

The themes addressed by Robert Browning are diverse and treated from various perspectives. This thematic diversity is made possible only by the variety of those who express it. As Charles Perquin writes, as soon as Browning takes an interest in an idea, a doctrine, or a system, "he creates a person to illustrate the issue." To this, Yann Tholoniat adds: "The figure of the author is reflected in all these speakers, and it dissolves into them, dissipates, merges, loses its substance, and withers at the same time as the ramifications of meaning multiply."

T. S. Eliot remarked, "What one normally hears in the dramatic monologue is the poet’s voice, dressed in the costume and makeup of some historical or fictional character." The multitude of characters serves as masks behind which Browning explores various facets of the same case.

Some characters earn Browning's approval—such as Fra Lippo Lippi, the monk-painter in love with life—while others, like Andrea del Sarto, a painter, do not, as a censor resides within Browning. Others still seem, at first glance, distant, like Bishop Blougram of Bishop Blougram's Apology, ensconced in his intellectual and doctrinal security. In How it Strikes a Contemporary, the protagonist, the Corregidor, presents an ambiguous profile. He may be a solitary poet detached from society, with divine inspiration and abstract poetry, or he may be a man of action, guided by humanity, producing objective and concrete poetry. Here, two masks exist for the same poem, which Browning tries in turn. Similarly, two characters share one mask, that of the speaker: Karshish and Lazarus in An Epistle Containing the Strange Medical Experience of Karshish, the Arab Physician. The former, like a scientific journalist, discovers a land and a faith, while the latter, once awakened from death, remains taciturn and dazed, like a child (line 117, referencing Matthew XVIII, 3), obedient as a sheep (line 119), with sudden impulsive outbursts that leave the letter's author puzzled. This represents what M. K. Mishler calls a "structural technique of tension and balance," summing up the cultural and spiritual clash central to the poem.

== Religious philosophy ==
In 1881, the Robert Browning Society was founded by Frederick Furnivall against Browning's wishes, who reportedly stated in French, "It seems to me that this sort of thing borders on the ridiculous." Nonetheless, the poet felt obliged to attend some meetings of this association, during which his poems were analyzed by others. These discussions often revolved around their philosophical interpretations. Browning's usual approach was to listen patiently, nod in agreement, thank the speaker for teaching him something new about his work, and leave without further comment.

=== A fluctuating attitude ===
The main poems concerned with the religious theme are, according to a list compiled by George P. Landow:

- Bishop Blougram's Apology;
- The Bishop Orders His Tomb at St. Praxed's Church;
- Cleon;
- Caliban Upon Setebos Or, Natural Theology in the Island;
- Johannes Agricola in Meditation;
- Christmas Eve and Easter Day;
- An Epistle Containing the Strange Medical Experience of Karshish, the Arab Physician;
- Rabbi Ben Ezra;
- Saul.

To these, Stefan Hawlin adds:

- A Toccata of Galuppi's;
- The Statue and the Bust;
- The Tragedy of the Heretic;
- Holy-Cross Day;

As well as three poems from Dramatis personae:

- A Death in the Desert;
- Apparent Failure;
- The Epilogue.

Yann Tholoniat includes Abt Vogler, from the same.

According to Glenn Everett, Browning's religious opinions shifted, a typical Victorian response to the challenges Christianity faced at the time. While his poetry demonstrates that he had overcome the "Shelleyan" temptation of his youth—marked by a passionate admiration for Shelley and an attempt to emulate his lifestyle and beliefs—it remains uncertain whether skepticism ever entirely left him. Browning expressed gratitude for a form of love "closely akin to Christian love" and was so well-versed in the Bible that he named his early collection Bells and Pomegranates, referencing the decorations on Hebrew priests’ robes—something even Elizabeth Barrett, well-read in the Scriptures, had not recognized. However, while many of his poems deal with faith and humanity's religious aspirations, the proposed solutions often accumulate without apparent coherence. Everett recounts an anecdote where, late in life, Browning emphatically responded "No!" when asked if he considered himself a Christian.

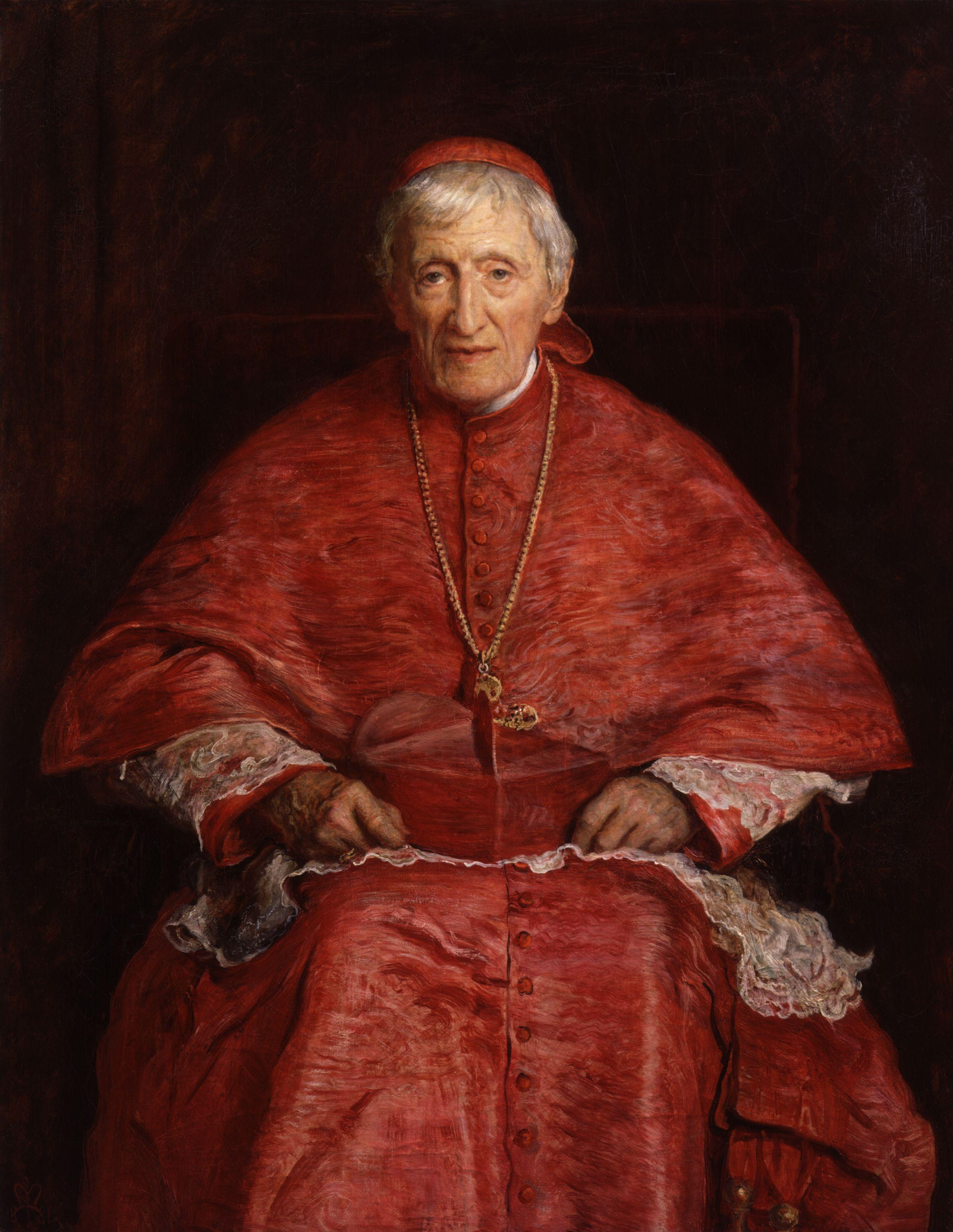
Cardinal John Henry Newman by Sir John Everett Millais.

Adding to this is Browning's reaction to a friend reading from Cardinal Newman’s Apologia Pro Vita Sua, where Newman, a former Anglican who had converted to Catholicism, claimed to be as certain of God's existence as his own. Browning later wrote to his friend Julia Wedgwood, stating, "I believe he deceives himself and that no sane man has ever had, with mathematical exactness." (Note: Complete quote: Last night I was talking with a friend who read aloud a passage from Mr. Newman's Apology in which he says that "he is as convinced of the existence of God"--an individual, not an external force merely--"as of his own existence:" I believe he deceives himself and that no sane man has ever had, with mathematical exactness, equal conviction on those two points—though the approximation to equality may be in any degree short of that: and looking at the practical effects of belief, I should expect that it would be so: I can see nothing that comes from absolute contact, so to speak, between man and God, but everything in all variety from the greater or less distance between the two. When anyone tells me that he has such a conviction, I look at a beggar who holds the philosopher's stone according to his profession. Do you see the bearing of all this as I seem to see it? How, remaining beggars—or poor, at least—we may at once look for the love of those to whom we give our mite, though we throw it into the darkness where they only may be: fortunately the experiment on our faith is never a very long one.) (Note: Robert Browning, Letter to Julia Wedgwood, 27 June 1864.)

=== The "annexation" of Browning's work ===
==== "Master of religion" ====
Despite Browning's resistance to being labeled a "master of religion," many contemporary critics regarded him as such. This view was highlighted in the 1900 (Note: Complete quote: I purchased a set of Browning's works. The first poem I read was Saul. I soon recognized that I was in the grasp of a strong hand, and as I continued to read Paracelsus, Men and Women and A Death in the Desert, the feeling came over me that in Browning I had found my religious teacher, one who could put me right on a hundred points which had troubled my mind for many years, and which had ultimately caused me to abandon the Christian religion. I joined the Browning Society, and in the discussions which followed the reading of the papers, I found the opportunity of having my doubts resolved, not by theological arguments, but by those suggested by Browning as 'solving for me all questions in the earth and out of it'. By slow and painful steps I found my way back to the faith I had forsaken.) Burney Essay Prize, organized annually by Christ's College, Cambridge, to promote the study of religious philosophy. Commentators such as Edward Berdoe asserted that Browning reconciled science and religion, demonstrating that "one complements the other" and achieving what Berdoe called "scientific religion." (Note: Complete quote from Edward Berdoe: TO OF ALL DENOMINATIONS OF CHRISTIANS, AND TO THOSE WHO ARE PERPLEXED AND IN DOUBT CONCERNING QUESTIONS OF THE UTMOST IMPORTANCE TO ALL, THESE PAGES ARE RESPECTFULLY DEDICATED BY ONE WHO HAS HIMSELF WANDERED IN THE MAZE AND FOUND ITS CLUE. One of our greatest spiritual path-makers and Alp-tunnellers was Robert Browning, Deep down under the mountain he laboured, practically forgotten, misunderstood, and neglected; yet he was foremost amongst the great constructors of the ways of intellectual activity. Those of us who have been down with the miners, know how many obstacles Browning has cleared away; those who have worked under his orders, know how firm and straight is the roadway he has constructed. Not only has he established a modus Vivendi between science and religion, but he has demonstrated that the one is the complement of the other. He has made scientific religion an accomplished fact.)

==== The "central truth" ====
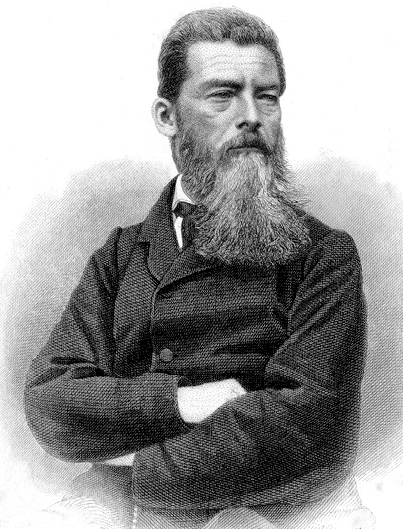
Ludwig Feuerbach (1804–1872), by August Weger (1823–1892).

Other critics, from the mid-20th century, focus on analyzing what they refer to as the "central truth" of Browning's work, which they consider to be of religious inspiration. For instance, William Whitla, a doctor from the University of Oxford and an emeritus professor at the University of Toronto, presented in 1963 a chapter entitled Spiritual Unity: Poetry and Religion, a sufficiently evocative title in itself. Whitla begins his demonstration with citations: in Paracelsus, Book V, line 638, the hero exclaims, "I knew, I felt… what God is, what we are, / What life is… / What is time to us?" (Note: Complete quote: I knew, I felt, (perception unexpressed, Uncomprehended by our narrow thought, But somehow felt and known in every shift And change in the spirit, nay, in every pore Of the body, even,) what God is, what we are, What life is how God tastes an infinite joy In infinite ways one everlasting bliss, From whom all being emanates, all power Proceeds; in whom is life for evermore, Yet whom existence in its lowest form Includes; where dwells enjoyment there is he; With still a flying point of bliss remote, A happiness in store afar, a sphere Of distant glory in full view; thus climbs Pleasure its heights for ever and for ever.) Similarly, in Sordello, V, 26, one finds the line "Fit to the finite his infinity," and in A Pillar at Sebzevar, as a sort of conclusion: We circumscribe omnipotence, which can be interpreted in two ways—either "we encompass omnipotence" or "we limit it." Whitla explains that during the 19th century, Christianity faced various assaults driven by scientific advancements, the discovery of geology and its related disciplines (and later Darwinism from 1859 onward), as well as philosophical developments, particularly the ideas of Feuerbach (1804–1872), who argued that God is merely a projection of human imagination. Finally, biblical criticism, led by the German scholar D.F. Strauss (1808–1874)—likely the model for the philosopher in Christmas Eve—claimed that the Church's Christological account of Jesus’ life was nothing more than a historical myth. These intellectual movements created a dichotomy, placing science and its methodologies on one side and religion on the other. Between these two domains, Whitla observes, a space of conflict emerged—one into which Browning "threw himself" to counterbalance what should have remained a critique rooted in biblical research but had instead evolved into a systematic assault on faith. "His response," Whitla writes, "was that of a poet, conveyed through the objective guise of speakers expressing themselves in a series of dramatic monologues."

==== The "incarnation" ====
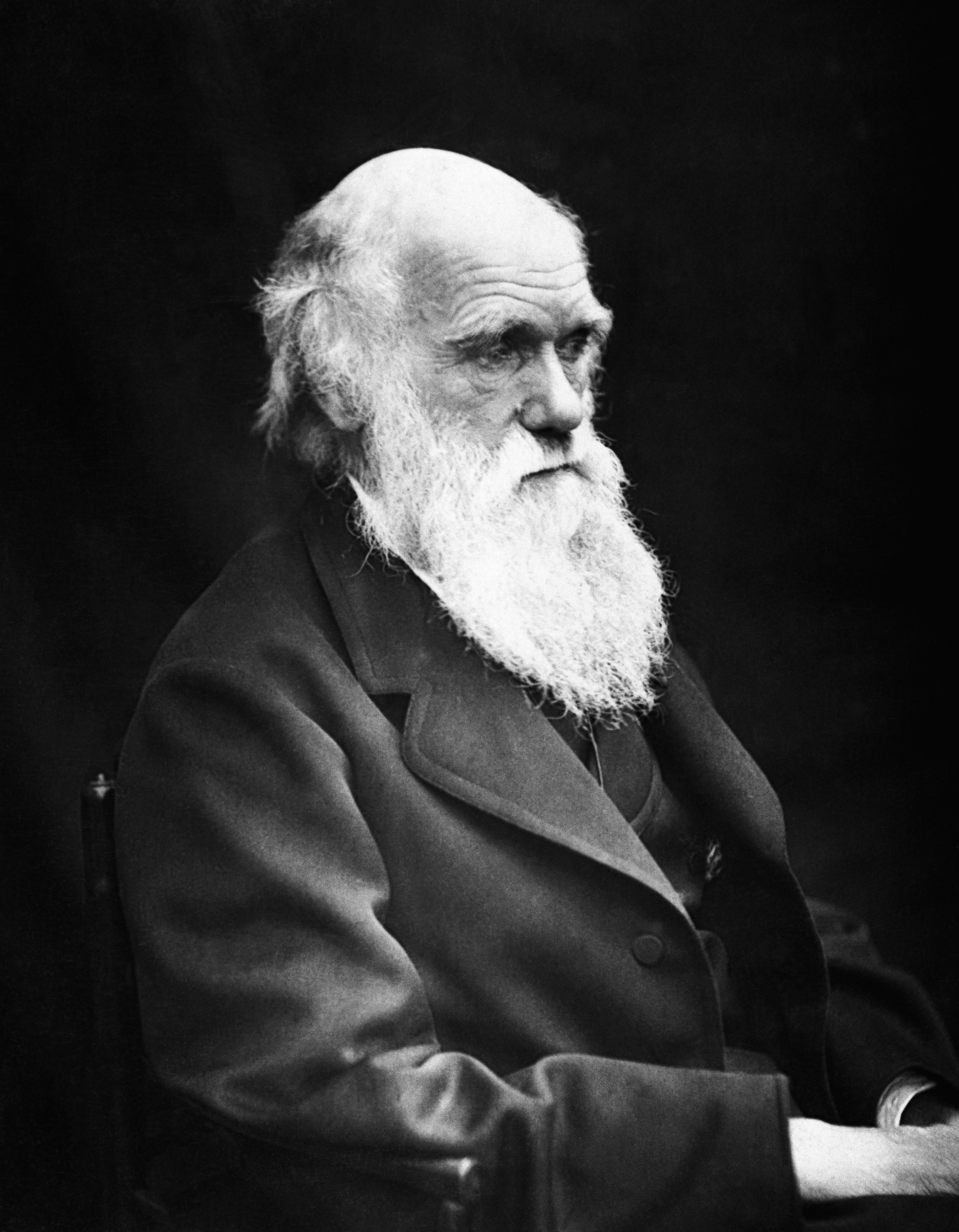
Charles Darwin in 1869, by J. Cameron.

Browning could offer an individual version of an orthodox theological position: his journey, starting from the naive belief of his childhood, moving first towards a form of "rational" indifference and agnosticism (this being the "Shelleyan" episode—see Precocity and Cultural Wanderings), and later towards a more mature belief, aligned with his mother’s evangelical piety. His work subsequently reflects his constant struggle to maintain this faith, made all the more resilient by its continual exposure to doubt. Beginning with Christmas Eve and Easter Day, Whitla adds, Browning had reached "a sufficiently coherent Christian point of reference to serve his poetry effectively." He emphasizes one of Browning's essential beliefs: the mystery of the Incarnation of Jesus Christ, citing Beryl Stone, who in 1957 highlighted the centrality of the Incarnation in the poet's thinking: "The symbol of Christ’s Incarnation provided Browning with an analogy to his own experience as an artist." Beryl Stone's argument is straightforward: just as God took on human form, the artist clothes in words the vision that inhabits him; if he can convey its truth, he "shares in Christ’s redemptive work by liberating humanity from the tyranny of error and the bondage of the 'self.'" To critics attacking Christianity, Browning responds, Whitla asserts, by affirming traditional faith in the Gospel, the early Church, and the Church Fathers.

Already, in an essay read at Balliol College in 1904, William Temple proposed the idea that, for Browning, "the apex of history, the pinnacle of philosophy, and the crowning of poetry is undoubtedly the Incarnation." According to Temple, this doctrine informs Browning's poetry in Saul, An Epistle Containing the Strange Medical Experience of Karshish, the Arab Physician, A Death in the Desert, and Christmas Eve and Easter-Day. When Whitla revisits this argument, he adds that Browning's approach led him to a "religious individualism" that caused him to "forget the community of believers and, consequently, overlook the expression of shared action in the sacrament." Temple and Whitla seem to suggest that Browning's interiorized religion distanced him from the Church, established or otherwise, and from communal practice.

==== The distancing ====
In response to this analysis, Glenn Everett argues that Browning's religious characters "generally take their beliefs to the extreme" and thereby discredit themselves. Everett sees the dramatic monologue as Browning's chosen means to present ideas that elicit neither the sympathy of the reader nor the poet and, in some cases, to refute certain positions by example without revealing his views. Thus, in Saul, the speaker is not a Church dignitary but David, a "quasi-Christ-like biblical figure," who expresses an undeniably Christian perspective in the final stanzas, XVIII and XIX: "I believe it! ’Tis Thou, God, that givest, ’tis I who receive; / In the first is the last, in Thy will is the power of my belief" (stanza XVIII, lines 1–2). (Note: First lines of stanza XIX: I know not too well how I found my way home in the night. / There were witnesses, cohorts about me, to left and to right, / Angels, powers, the unuttered, unseen, the alive, the aware: / I repressed, I got through them as hardly, as strugglingly there, / As a runner beset by the populace famished for news — / Life or death. The whole earth was awakened, hell loosed with her crews; / And the stars of night beat with emotion, and tingled and shot / Out in fire the strong pain of pent knowledge; but I fainted not.) However, David’s ecstatic declarations do not necessarily reflect the author’s stance.

=== The quasi-certainties ===
==== A certain interest ====
===== Doubt, a spur to faith =====
There is no denying that Browning was interested in religious matters. He could approach the topic intellectually, as in Bishop Bloughram’s Apology, a title echoing Cardinal Newman’s Apologia Pro Vita Sua (1865). Bishop Bloughram, a character modeled on Cardinal Wiseman, (Note: Nicholas Patrick Stephen Wiseman (1802–1865), a Catholic prelate, influenced the Oxford Movement of John Henry Newman, who, distancing himself from Anglicanism, drew closer to Catholicism.) responds to an English journalist, Mr. Gigadibs, (Note: In this surname, the word "gig" is hidden, referring to a type of dance [gigue] and a small bouncing cabriolet, in sync with the equally bouncing reactions of the questioner.) who expresses amazement that, in the 19th century, an educated and informed individual could still believe in the Church's teachings. The bishop's response, complex and nuanced, manages to turn doubt itself into a powerful spur for faith.

===== From primitive religion to the sublime =====
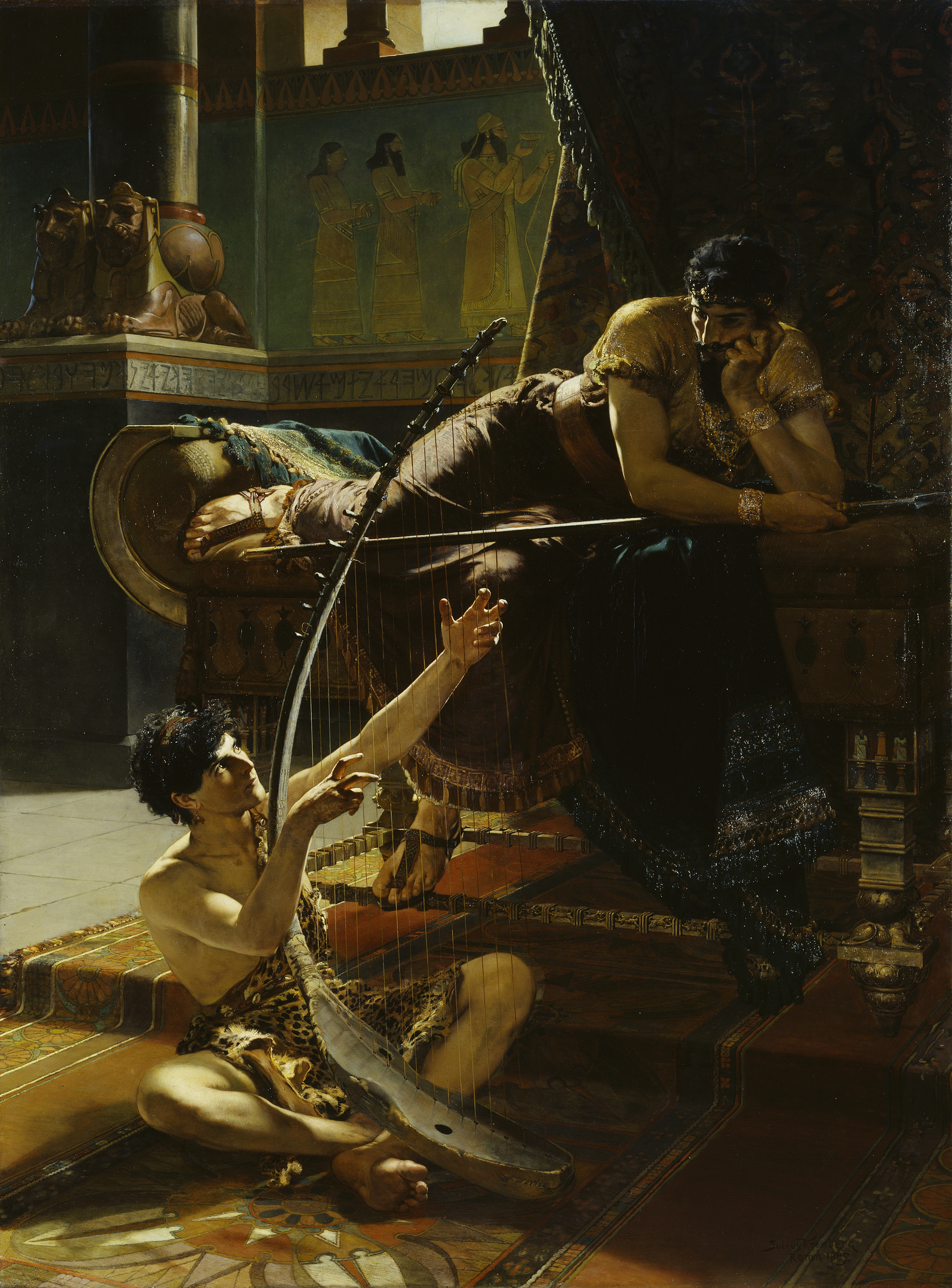
David and Saul by Julius Kronberg, 1885.

At the opposite extreme, Caliban upon Setebos: Or, Natural Theology in the Island (1864) depicts religious sentiment in its most primitive form. The grotesque Caliban, who speaks of himself in the third person—something John Lucas interprets as evidence that he has not yet attained self-awareness—worships the monstrous, savage god Setebos. Caliban addresses this deity in an archaic language, described by Yann Tholoniat as a sort of Ursprache, characterized by elliptical syntax, frequent references to the body, and the use of monosyllabic verbs describing animal movements and cries: sprawl, creep, snarl, groan, hiss. These elements portray Caliban as having a nature barely "refined."

In contrast, Saul, in which David sings of divine beauty, achieves the sublime.

===== An epistle "buzzing with biblical resonances" =====
Browning effectively conveys curiosity and incomprehension about the divine potentially being made flesh. This theme resonates throughout An Epistle Containing the Strange Medical Experience of Karshish, the Arab Physician, a poem "buzzing with biblical resonances." Its fictional narrator, an Arab doctor steeped in rationalism, is struck dumb with astonishment as he recounts the irrational miracle of "the Nazarene Sage," this Christ—also a healer—who, some years earlier, had raised Lazarus from his tomb.

===== The quest within =====
In Childe Roland to the Dark Tower Came, Browning seems to prefer the positive aspect of failure (the squire Roland finally reaches the Dark Tower) over falsehood or compromise. Roland's quest symbolizes an extraordinary human life. When John Chadwick asked Browning if the poem could be summed up by the biblical verse, "He that endureth to the end shall be saved," (Note: Matthew 10 (22), Authorized version of 1611) Browning responded laconically and evasively: "Just about that."

Browning's response did not put an end to speculation about the poem's meaning. As John Lucas notes, numerous echoes have been identified in the work: references to John Bunyan’s The Pilgrim's Progress (though, while the full title of Bunyan's work is The Pilgrim's Progress From This World to That Which Is to Come, Roland's path does not lead to a land of hope); (Note: The literature of the quest generally involves a well-defined goal, the arrival, the mythical castle, the Grail being the reward for efforts made and virtues displayed—determination, courage, endurance, resistance to temptations; the heroes eventually triumph over all obstacles, such as Parsifal who tears the precious Grail from the magician Klingsor, the Red Cross knight from Spenser's The Faerie Queene, Bunyan's pilgrim, the aptly named Christian. This literature originates in the exploits of ancient heroes, Hercules and his twelve labors, Jason and his conquest of the Golden Fleece, all characters who were neither motivated by the promise of a better life nor remarkable for their cardinal virtues.) allusions to scientific advancements, particularly Charles Lyell’s Principles of Geology (1830–32), which scientifically dated the Earth's age, refuting the idea of a seven-day creation—hence the symbolic description of a tormented, ulcerated, and hostile desert.

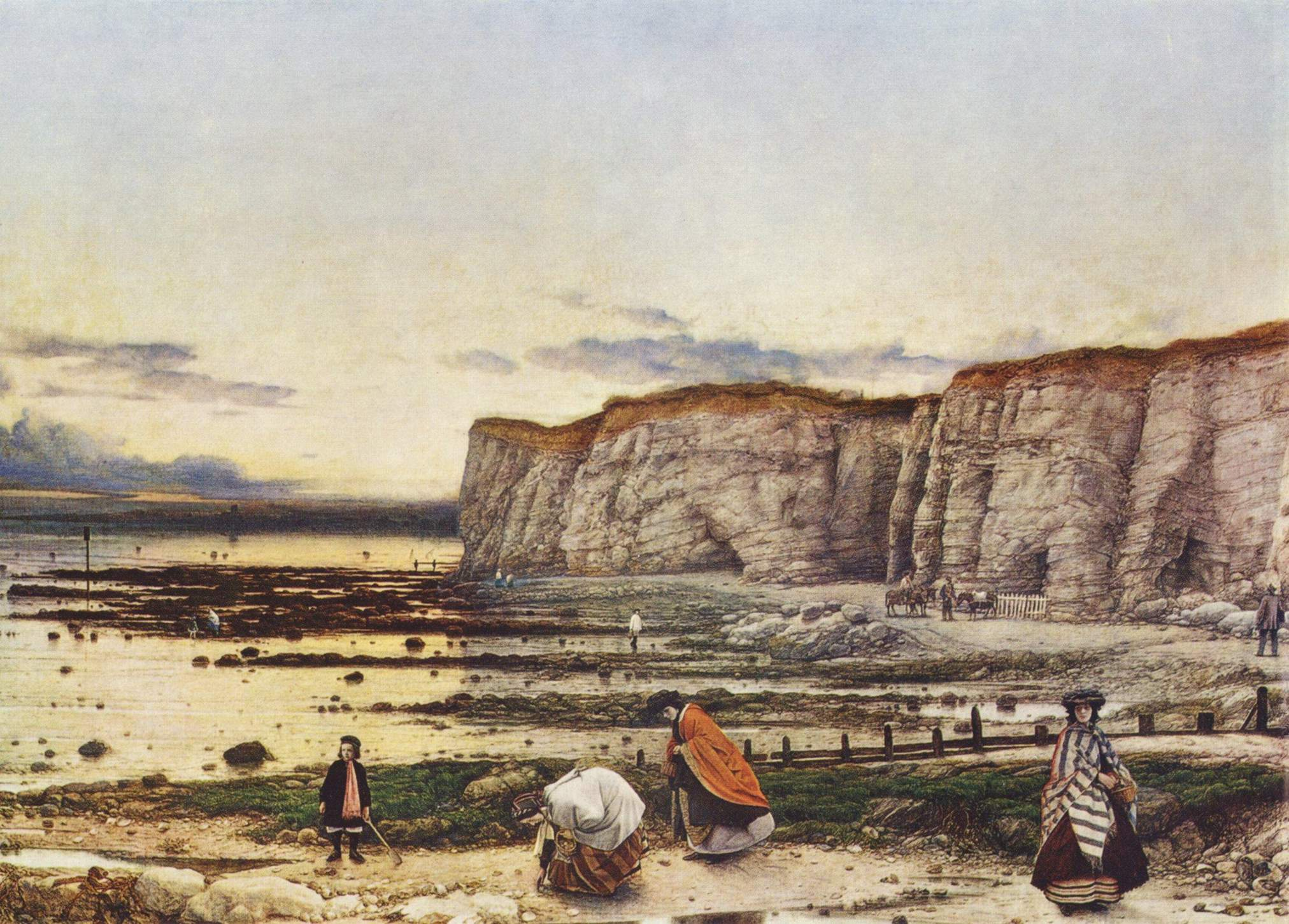
Pegwell Bay, by William Dyce.

In the late 1850s, William Dyce (1806–1860) painted Pegwell Bay, Kent, a recollection of 5 October 1858 (a year before Darwin's On the Origin of Species was published). In this painting, now displayed at the Tate Gallery, women and children are seen collecting fossils on the beach, beneath cliffs streaked with geological veins. The somber landscape, dim lighting, and brown and black clothing illustrated nature surrendered to science—a scene where "God has disappeared." According to John Lucas, the desert in Childe Roland to the Dark Tower Came symbolizes "the spirit of the Quest," while the dark tower, like Dyce's beach, portrays a godless universe "without light and without redemptive end." (Note: John Lucas also sees in this dark tower a "phallocentric" symbol standing above a cursed and barren landscape, representing an entirely masculine world.)

===== Religious prophets =====
In the latter part of his career, Browning composed a series of poems titled Parleyings with Certain People of Importance in Their Day (1887). Among the notable religious, political, and literary figures included, Christopher Smart stands out. Smart, who had published A Song to David—a poem Browning knew by heart —is a counterpoint to poets like Edwin Arnold and Robert Montgomery. These poets grounded their work in a universal cosmic consciousness. Browning critiques their approach through the lines: “We scale the skies, then drop / To earth – to find, how all things there are loth / To answer heavenly law: we understand / The meteor's course, and lo, the rose's growth.” (Note: Complete quote: We scale the skies, then drop To earth – to find, how all things there are loth To answer heavenly law: we understand The meteor's course, and lo, the rose's growth - How other than should be by law's command!) Understanding the course of meteors represents scientific knowledge of the universe’s workings and aligns with a godless worldview. In contrast, Browning’s Christopher Smart responds: “Friends, beware [...] learn earth first ere presume / To teach heaven legislation. Law must be [...] Live and learn / Live and learn / Not first learn and then live, is our concern." (Note: Complete quote: Friends, beware lest fume Obfuscate sense: learn earth first ere presume To teach heaven legislation. Law must be Active in earth or nowhere: earth you see, - Or there or not at all, Will, Power and Love Admit discovery, – as below, above Seek law's next confirmation!… Live and learn Not first learn and then live, is our concern.) Late in life, Browning uses Smart to caution religious prophets (like the Jesuit Bartoli, 1609–1685), political figures (such as George Bubb Doddington, 1691–1762, whom Browning uses to critique Disraeli), and scientists.

===== "The delusion of contemplatives" =====
In Johannes Agricola in Meditation, Browning satirizes what Nietzsche called the "delusion of contemplatives." Yann Tholoniat observes that readers are led to question "the political place of religion in a society like that of Fra Lippo Lippi, compared to that of the bishop in Bishop Bloughram's Apology and the Caliban of Caliban upon Setebos. From poem to poem, Browning’s concept of divinity undergoes a metamorphosis—a layering of perspectives that Tholoniat describes as an anaglyph of the divine concept. These varying depictions—from David, Caliban, Karshish, Bloughram, the bishop of The Bishop Orders His Tomb at Saint Praxed’s Church, to St. John in A Death in the Desert—contribute to the emergence of Browning’s perspective.

==== From "infinity in the finite" ====
Browning's own creative process becomes a metaphor for creation itself, as it endeavors to contain, in A.S. Byatt's words (from a lecture at the Browning Society), "the infinite" within "the finite." His descriptions of the Incarnation, artistic creation, and the temptation to transcend the body, time, and history consistently aim to "thrust eternity into the axis of time" (Sordello, I, v. 566)—that is, to place the infinite within the finite. Such epiphanies are revealed to characters at pivotal, often final moments. Lovers exclaim, "Oh moment, one and infinite!" (By the Fireside, v. 181) or The moment become eternity (The Last Ride Together, v. 108). These eternal moments embody an ultimate union of body and soul: “Because our innermost beings met and mixed” (Any Wife to Any Husband, v. 50), or “We were mixed at last / In spite of the mortal screen” (By the Fireside, v. 234–235).

Similarly, music transcends time: “And I know not if, save in this, such gift be allowed to man, / That out of three sounds he frame, not a fourth sound, but a star” (Abt Vogler, v. 51–52). This reflection on time is "intimately linked to Browning’s exploration of the mystery of the Incarnation throughout his work, where the dramatic monologues can be seen as incarnations," revealed through epiphanies. Browning described these moments to Elizabeth Barrett: "[...] bursts of my inner power, living within me like those peculiar lighthouses found in the Mediterranean, where the light revolves endlessly in a dark gallery, vivid, alive, and only after a long interval, springs forth through a narrow fissure and extends [...]."

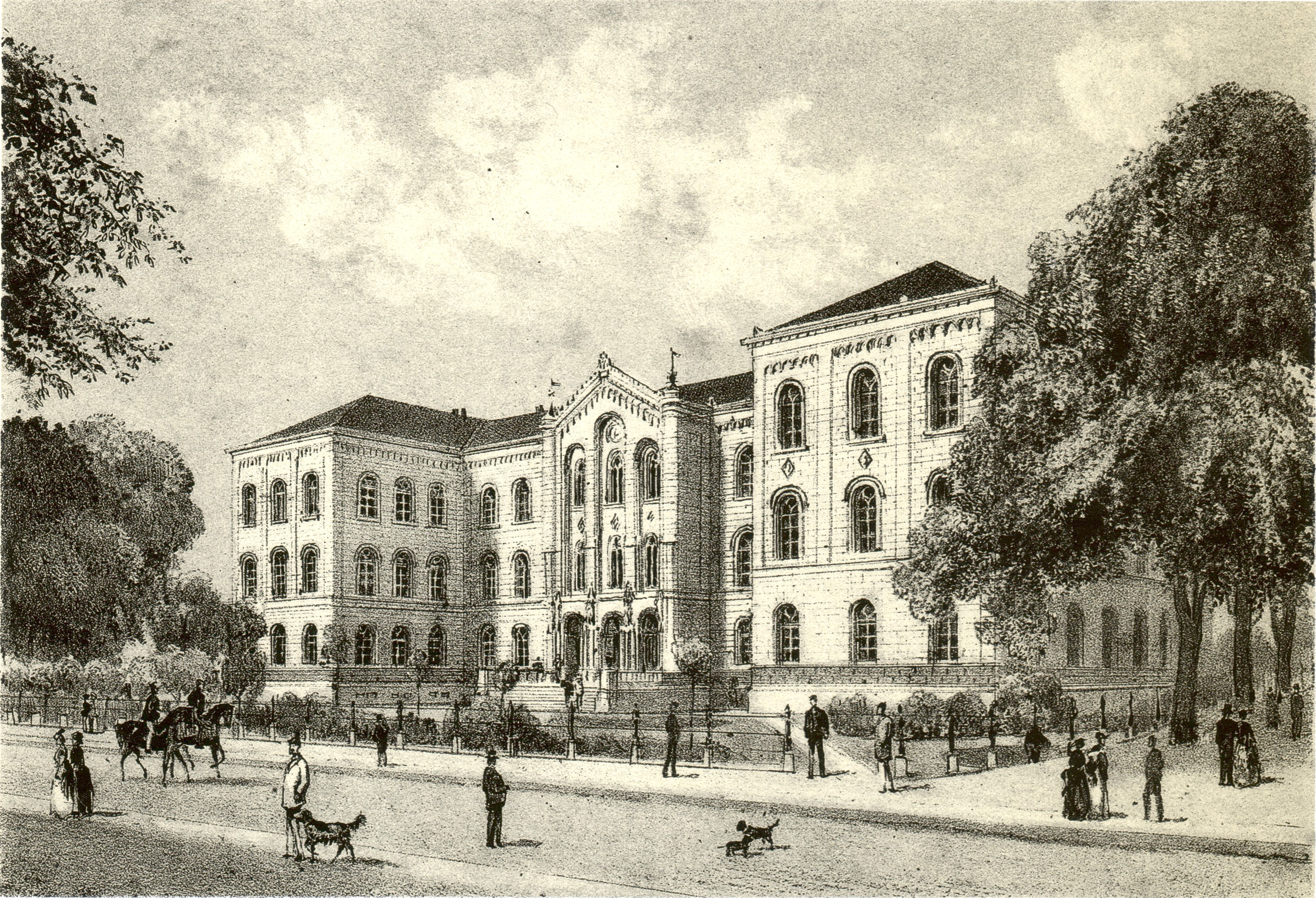
The great amphitheatre of the University of Göttingen, where the learned debates of German scholars are supposed to take place.

==== The gallery of creeds ====
The poems Christmas-Eve and Easter Day, published together in 1850, offer additional insights. In the former, the speaker compares three modes of belief: that of the Nonconformist Church, somewhere in England; that of Catholicism as seen in St. Peter's in Rome; and that emanating from the biblical exegeses conducted by German scholars (Higher Criticism) in Göttingen. The professor there, the speaker asserts, "inflates you with ruthless ingenuity like a drouthy piston / Atom by atom […] and leaves you—vacuity" ([...] like a drouthy piston [he] / Pomps out with ruthless ingenuity / Atom by atom, and leaves you—vacuity), Christmas Eve, lines 912–913.

By doing this, he favors the imperfect but sufficiently flexible and open belief system in which Browning was raised—namely, his mother's dissenting faith, which was presented first. Easter Day, the companion (or counterpart) poem, is more austere and focuses not on the manifestations of worship or the exegesis of sacred texts but on the very nature of faith in the omnipotence and omnipresence of God. As Pettigrew and Collins write in the notes to the 1981 Penguin edition, the poet "lays out his religious beliefs in these poems after a long period of uncertainty. And here, as his wife had urgently requested, he expresses himself far more directly than he usually does."

==== God, but within oneself ====
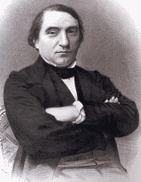
Ernest Renan (1823-1892).

The collection Dramatis personae, published in 1864, contains poem named Epilogue, whose significance regarding Browning's religious position is "universally recognized," according to Pettigrew and Collins. Employing a strategy he had used before, Browning presents three characters (hence Yann Tholoniat's term, "triphonic poem") representing three perspectives on Christianity. The first, David (the prophet), seeks God within the Church. The second, Renan (the historian), offers a more pessimistic view, concluding that Christ's death is irreversible—a direct allusion to Ernest Renan (1823–1892), whose The Life of Jesus was published in 1863. The third speaker remains anonymous, juxtaposing the search for God externally with finding God within one's inner self. Philip Drew interprets this final stance as the one Browning had reached by 1864. For Browning, Drew explains, God was no longer located "in orthodox Christianity" but could only be found in the depths of the self. Religion, therefore, had become a matter of intimacy.

== Art ==
Dramatic monologues that focus on art are key in Browning's work. Beyond the artistic labor itself, what interests the poet is the philosophy underlying the creative process. In The Ring and the Book, Browning repeatedly invites reflection on an edifying morality (I, verse 237; XII, verses 20, 206, 419, 832), which, according to him, can only be achieved through deliberate contemplation: "Moral sense grows but with the exercise," he writes (The Pope, X, verse 1415). However, in his view, the only valid morality is that of the work of art itself, which he conveys through a musical metaphor in verses 860–863 of the poem The Book and the Ring.

So, note by note, bring music to your mind,
Deeper than ever the Andante dived,
So write a book shall mean, beyond the facts,
Suffice the eye and save the soul beside (Note: Vladimir Jankélévitch also considers that morality and music cannot be dissociated: “The intention of the severe and serious Muse is not to enchant us with song, but to induce virtue in us”. (Jankélévitch, Vladimir (1961). La Musique et l'Ineffable [Music and the Ineffable] (in French). Paris: Seuil. p. 14.))

=== Art philosophy ===
==== Painting ====
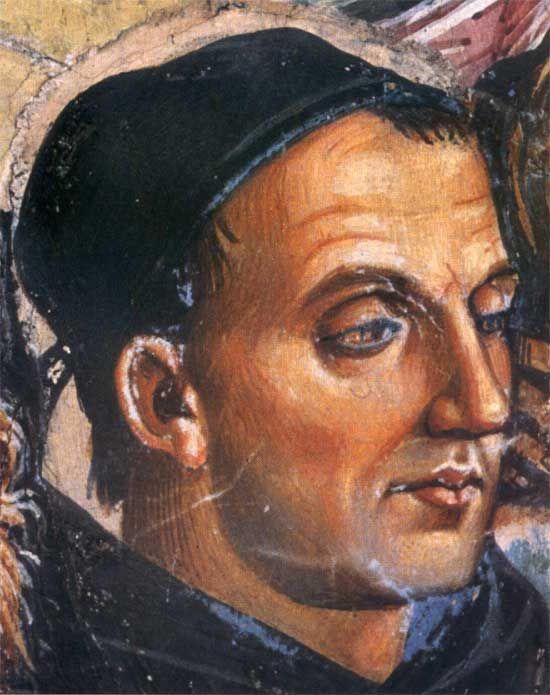
Fra Angelico ca 1501, by Luca Signorelli.

In Fra Lippo Lippi, the speaker, a rowdy monk-painter, bawdy and curious about everything, claims that painting allows him to observe the world with greater clarity and to derive certain life lessons from it. For him, art idealizes the beauty of the tangible world—for example, the smile of a beloved person to which it grants an enhanced radiance. This issue posed a significant concern for the 15th-century Church—whether art could depict the flesh without undermining its spiritual impact. Such representations risked fostering human idolatry and diverting attention from the contemplation of the divine. According to John Lucas, the poet's sympathy for the views expressed by the monk "is beyond doubt."

However, this perspective, presented by Lippo Lippi with the fervor of deep conviction, goes beyond a defense of realism or naturalism. Stefan Hawlin has shown that behind this poem lies a French work by Alexis François Rio, De la poésie chrétienne, which portrays 15th-century Italy as decadent compared to the "authenticity" of artists like Giotto (1266–1337) or Fra Angelico (1387–1455). Some prominent English figures, such as Mary Shelley, John Ruskin, and Anna Jameson (a friend of the Brownings), approved of these views. However, Browning opposed them, presenting the life and work of Filippo Lippi, and also of Masaccio (whom the monk mentions), as an antidote to what he considered to be simplistic and erroneous conceptions.

===== The arts of stone =====
Sculpture and architecture, featured in The Statue and the Bust (1855) and The Bishop Orders His Tomb at Saint Praxed's Church (1854), allow for the immortalization of a character in stone, granting them a form of immortality. According to John Lucas, in the case of the bishop in the second poem, "this magnificent old scoundrel," the desired immortality is complicated by a brazen eroticism, which the stone must depict. Lucas sees this as a clear deviation of Browning from the "mutilated sensuality" that "poisons art in the mid-19th century," which "poisons," meaning it clutters and deceives through omission. (Note: The immense work of Trollope, for example, with over forty novels, featuring love affairs, troubled couple stories, etc., does not include a single love scene, nor any direct eroticism. Events related to romantic passion typically take place in the silence between chapters.)

===== Music =====
Music, present but not directly explored, although Browning was very knowledgeable both theoretically (Music was my grammar, he had written) and in practice (he played the piano and organ and protested, "I know what I’m talking about when I speak of music!" (Note: Robert Browning's musical culture was reassessed in 1991 by Schoffman, Nachum (1991). There is no truer Truth, The Musical Aspect of Robert Browning, 1833–1846. New York: Greenwood Press. and Plamondon, Marc R. (1999). "What do you mean by your Montainous Fugues: A Musical Reading of Robert Browning's A Tocata of Galuppi's et Master Hugues of Saxe-Gotha". Victorian Poetry. 37 (3). West Virginia University Press: 309–332.)), plays a central role in four poems.

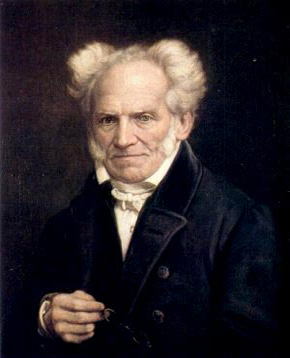
Arthur Schopenhauer (1788–1860).

These are A Toccata of Galuppi's, where a contemporary English pianist unfamiliar with Italy is transported by his performance of a toccata by Baldassare Galuppi (1706–85) into a Venetian carnival of the previous century; Master Hugues of Saxe-Gotha, in which five musical phrases intersect in a contrapuntal fugue pattern, stanza XII onwards; in this context, Richard D. Attick recounts a conversation Browning had with his friend Collins, during which Browning claimed that in the poem, his sole "allegorical" intention was to represent the structure of the fugue, "a possible expression of the labyrinth of human life"; Charles Avison (1887) with his musical theory akin to that developed by Schopenhauer in The World as Will and Representation (1819), which had been translated into English in 1883, presenting music as "the direct expression of the Infinite Will"; and finally, Abt Vogler, where the speaker, inspired by a rival of Beethoven in terms of keyboard improvisation, (Note: Abt Vogler (1749–1814), an organist, recognized improviser, theorist, pedagogue, and composer, invented an instrument called the "orchestrion," a large organ on which, as he speaks in the poem, he is supposed to have just completed an improvisation. The subtitle is: After he has been extemporising upon the musical instrument of his invention. Browning also admired him for having been the teacher of John Relfe, his music master.) describes music as "ephemeral," symbolizing human life in constant search of its resolution, the return to the peace of the tonic after the deviations of the dominant.

J. W. Harper, following E. D. H. Johnson, believes that, "because it addresses emotion rather than intellect," Browning placed music at the pinnacle of all the arts. He might not have been wrong, at least in his conclusion: the poet gave his future wife an impassioned account of a performance of Fidelio he attended during his youth; in Pauline, verses 365–367, he writes, "Music is like a voice [...] it offers us strange emotions / That nowhere else could ever be revealed." During his organ improvisations, the protagonist of Abt Vogler believes he achieves the "expression of the Absolute" through a process of revelation, in the Joycean sense of "epiphanic": from the first stanza, Vogler worries whether his restored organ will allow him to confront the various musical constructions he aspires to (he uses the verb "build" and the noun "work" in the first two lines, and in verse 66, he exclaims, "Builder and maker, thou, of houses not made with hands").

In a series exulting with visionary rapture, further accentuated by the use of a long line with six stresses, an English alexandrine, (Note: Complete quote: And the emulous heaven yearned down, made efforts to reach the earth, / As the earth had done her best, in my p)assion, to scale the sky: / Novel spendours burst forth, grew familiar, and dwelt with mine, / Not a point nor peak but found and fixed its wandering star; / Meteor-moons, balls of blaze: and they did not pale nor pine, / For earth had attained to heaven, there was no more near nor far.) he "sees" (I see) a world regulated, thanks to music, by total harmony, a sort of Leibnizian world: " […] the earth had done its best, in my passion, to lift itself to the heavens." At that moment, the primary importance for him is to realize all the creative potential he feels he possesses; thus, he poses the crucial question: "To whom then do I turn but to thee, the ineffable Name?" And, with prayer, suddenly trusting again, he exclaims, "There shall never be one lost good! What was, shall live as / before..."

Yet, in the final stanza (XI) of the poem, the vision fades; the musician returns to earth: "Well, so it is with me and the earth; silence has resumed its rights: "I will be patient and proud, and soberly acquiesce"; and he returns to "the usual chord," that of C major, without sharps or flats (The C major of this life), and now, he can try to sleep ( [...] so now I will try to sleep). Since the poem was written after the publication of The Origin of Species by Darwin, one of its purposes would thus be to celebrate a vision of the world that has become obsolete and no longer holds sway.

=== Responsibility of the artist ===
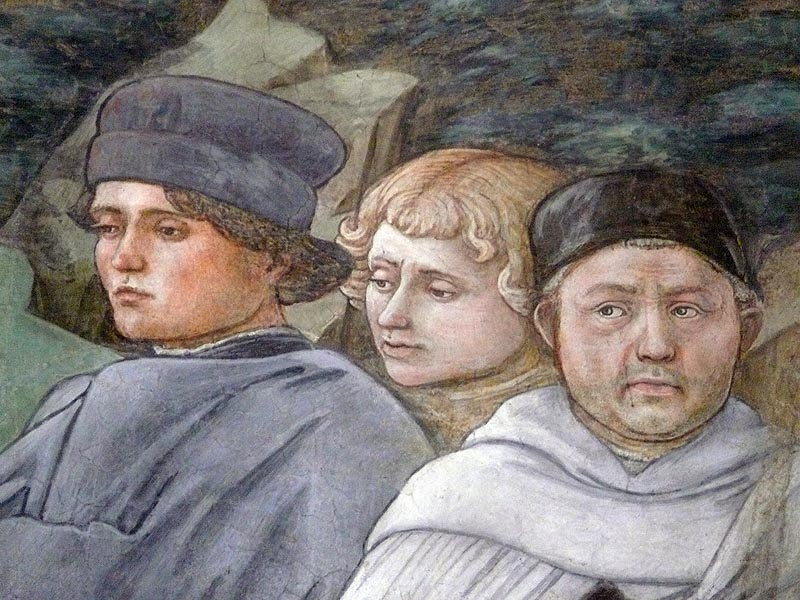
Self-portrait of Fra Lippo Lippi (right), with two of his pupils (Funeral of the Virgin, fresco in Spoleto Cathedral).

==== Subjects ====
Beyond the responsibility the artist feels toward himself, such as Andrea del Sarto, who navigates between two constraints—his creative inspiration and the need to please—Robert Browning attempted to delve into the relationship between art and morality. The role of the artist raises questions about whether there is a moral duty to depict characters free of vices and flaws and whether expressing a value judgment about them is necessary. However, like most of his contemporaries—Dickens, Thackeray, his wife Elizabeth Barrett, George Eliot, to name just a few—Browning populated his work with criminals and sinners driven by hatred, jealousy, or the will to power. The very formula of the dramatic monologue, allowing him to explore evil by proxy, leaves the responsibility of judgment to the reader, without the creator of the character ever explicitly expressing his opinion; his poems Porphyria's Lover and My Last Duchess, with their malicious artists, provide striking examples of this attitude, since no one knows, in the first poem, what God thinks ("who said nothing"), and by extension, what the poet thinks, and in the second, it is only in hindsight that the reader realizes that the Duke of Ferrara is "spoken [and with what darkness!] by his own speech."

==== Ethics ====
Throughout the poems, a conception of the artist's role emerges that is ethical and aesthetic. Browning wrote as early as 1845 to Elizabeth Barrett: "A poet's affair is with God, – to whom he is accountable, and of whom is his reward," God seen and felt in all the manifestations of the universe: "I but open my eyes — and perfection, no more and no less, / In the kind I imagined, full-fronts me, and God is seen, God / In the star, in the stone, in the flesh, in the soul and the clod" (Note: Saul, verse XVII.) Hence the idea that art and life cannot be separated. Fra Lippo Lippi, intimately convinced of this realistic necessity, rejects, in contrast to Pictor Ignotus (the nameless painter), who conforms to tradition, the fixed theory of his Superior Father that painting bodies as they are presents an obstacle to the fullness of spiritual life. For him, on the contrary, "the flesh is good," as are all manifestations of life: thus, the artist's dream is to embrace in art, with the same affectionate warmth, the earth and all living beings, including humans, whatever they may be and as they are. Pictor Ignotus ultimately says the same when he expresses his regret: "Oh, thus to live, I and my picture, linked / With love about, and praise, till life should end," (Pictor Ignotus, verses 36 and 37).

=== The artist, Interpreter of God ===
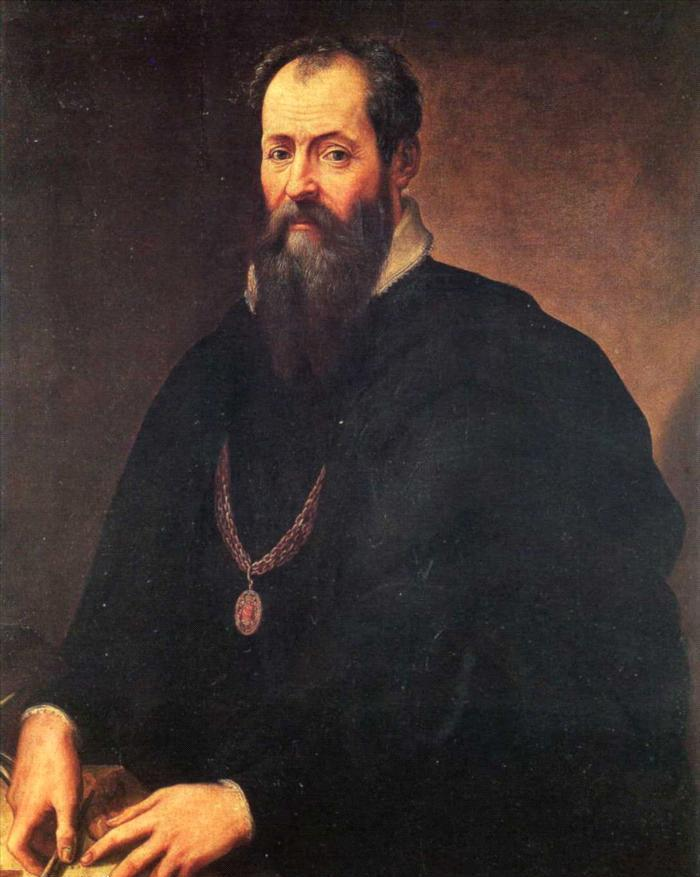
Giorgio Vasari, Self-portrait.

==== "Remain the man, don't ape the muse" ====
For this reason, like Fra Lippo Lippi and unlike Saint John the Baptist, whom he references four times, the artist understands "the value and meaning of the flesh" (line 325). (Browning had read Giorgio Vasari, who, in his Lives of the Artists, emphasizes the carnal love that the real Filippo Lippi had for women.) Because of this understanding, the artist can only strive toward a form of realism: "Remain the man, don't ape the muse" (Aristophanes' Apology, line 5182). This is not about the servile imitation of reality: "Suppose you reproduce her—(which you can't)—/ There's no advantage! you must beat her, then." (Fra Lippo Lippi, lines 298–299). Art is then about revealing the meaning of things: "To find its meaning is my meat and drink" (line 315), and the artist’s intuition is to uncover, beneath the patina of time and habit, a world whose reality surpasses the mere appearance of things. The artist thus restores the essential truth to the world, and in doing so, the artist, the Maker-See (literally "Maker-See"), fulfills their mission as an interpreter of God ("He interprets God to all of you," Fra Lippo Lippi, line 311).

==== The "spy of God" ====
In his Essay on Shelley (1852), Browning had already clearly formulated his conception: "Without the poet, it is the incomplete splendor of the rising sun, the mystery then unlit of the lake." In How it Strikes a Contemporary, the people even take the poet-hero for a "royal" spy, so sharp is his intuition. The conclusion of this poem shows that the popular misunderstanding is quite natural: it is the poet's duty to act as a spy of human life, of the mystery of things, for he is the spy of God.

In this, Browning shares the opinion of other Romantic or post-Romantic poets who presented themselves as seers, (Note: Browning himself, in his Essay on Shelley, uses the word: "He is rather a seer, accordingly, than a fashioner, and what he produces will be less a work than an effluence" (p. 112-113).) "prophets" (literally: "seeing"), (as in Intimations of Immortality from Recollections of Early Childhood, Wordsworth), sounding echoes ("This century was two years old," Les Feuilles d'automne, Victor Hugo), lighthouses ("Les phares", Les Fleurs du mal, Baudelaire), seers ("Letter to Georges Izambard, May 13, 1871" and "Letter of the Seer, to Paul Demeny, May 15, 1871", Rimbaud).

With everything imbued with meaning, the artist, serving both God and humanity, finds value in both what appears beautiful and what seems ugly. In this process, the artist respects the divine design and seeks to capture its essence. Art and spirituality remain closely linked, with art, like life, being regarded as a form of religion.

== Nature ==
The most famous poems where nature plays a primary role are the three main love poems in Men and Women (1855): Love Among the Ruins, By the Fireside, and Two in the Campagna, to which can be added Childe Roland to the Dark Tower Came, An Epistle Containing the Strange Medical Experience of Karshish, the Arab Physician, Cleon, and Saul.

=== Landscapes ===
The landscapes described by Browning range from Europe (France, England, and Italy) to the Middle East, Arabia, and Palestine (Jericho, Jerusalem, in An Epistle Containing the Strange Medical Experience of Karshish, the Arab Physician, lines 21 and 34). Yet they mostly fall into three main types: bucolic, luxuriant, and desert.

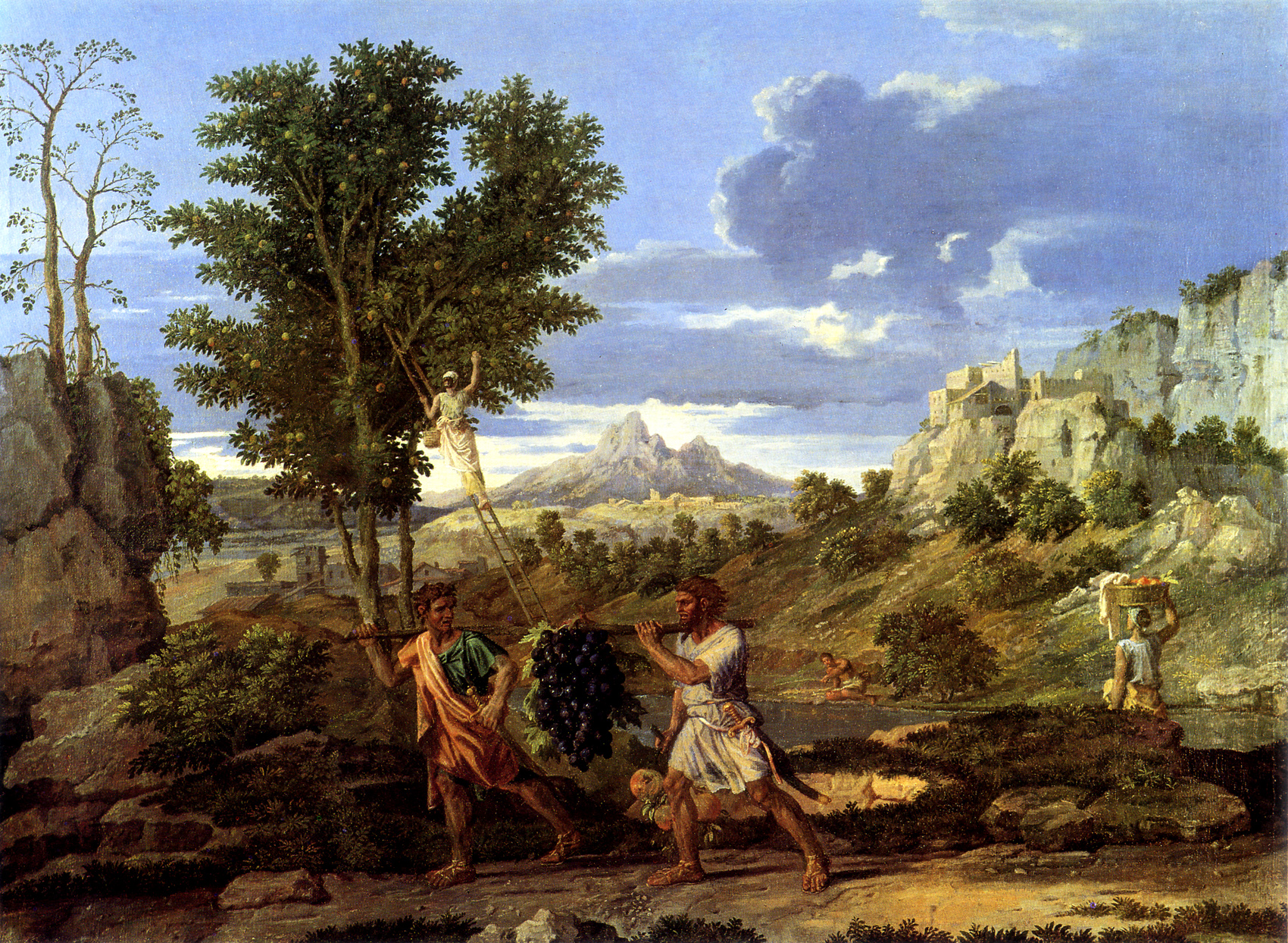
Nicolas Poussin, L'Automne, ou La Grappe de raisin rapportée de la Terre promise (1660–1664).

==== From pastoral to luxuriant and desert ====
Love Among the Ruins unfolds in a pastoral setting of the Virgilian type, with hills, streams, and green meadows, inhabited by a couple of young shepherds. Two in the Campagna has the subtitle Sicilian Pastoral; Browning, who did not know Sicily, more likely had in mind the painting by Poussin Autumn, or The Cluster of Grapes from the Promised Land, sometimes also called Roman Campagna in English, which he had discovered in his childhood at the Dulwich Gallery. (Note: On the relationship between Robert Browning and the work of Nicolas Poussin, see Gostüski 1969, pp. [LV] 372–383) The choice of the countryside surrounding Rome is significant: in the 19th century, this region, once neglected because of its mosquito infestation, had taken on a symbolic dimension, as it was freed from the rules imposed by social life, where anything could happen, as shown in the novels of Henry James set in Italy, or Nathaniel Hawthorne's The Marble Faun. In the poem, this "Campagna" seems to invite the speaker to transcend their human limits and poeticize their feelings, though in vain, as, disappointed by the course of things, they will return to their original melancholy. By the Fireside presents a wild mountain landscape (Alpine gorge), with forests, ferns, a lake, and an abundance of freely flowing water. There is no idealization here, where, aside from a small element resembling Love Among the Ruins, a small tower in one and a chapel in the other, solitude and desolation predominate. The threatening expanses of a troubled desert accompany the journeys of Karshish (An Epistle Containing the Strange Medical Experience of Karshish, the Arab Physician), Roland (Childe Roland to the Dark Tower Came), and the protagonist of A Death in the Desert.

==== The composite composition ====
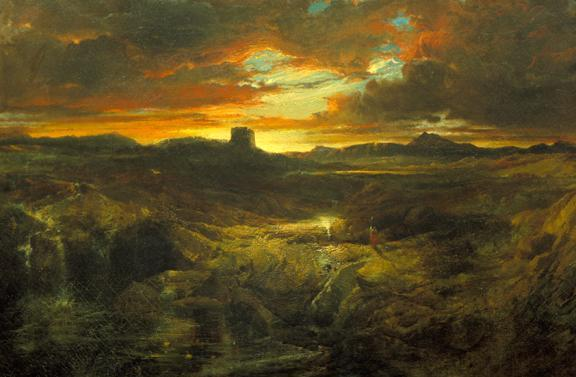
Childe Roland to the Dark Tower Came, par Thomas Moran (1859).

These landscapes, however, are not necessarily composed from nature. More often, they are composites, as shown in the example of Childe Roland to the Dark Tower Came. While the tower was seen in the Carrara Mountains (which Elizabeth had dedicated a poem to in 1842, The Hills of Carrara), during a trip to Italy, a painting admired in Paris completed the scene, and Roland's horse is none other than the animal depicted in a tapestry in the family salon, all cemented by the memory of a line from King Lear (Act III, Scene 4, line 187), which alludes to a set of ballads and legends known to the poet.

==== Temporal hinges ====
Browning favors pivotal moments in the year or day, the turning of the seasons, the articulations of time, and among them, those that seem laden with a threat, the calm before the storm, the passage from twilight to night, as in Love Among the Ruins, stanzas I and V, The Ring and the Book, I, lines 593–595, A Toccata of Galuppi's, lines 35 and 43, Andrea del Sarto ("Look, twilight has settled and a star shines"), Childe Roland ("The dying twilight came glowing through a gap," stanza XXXII), or In a Gondola. And again, when the colors shift from green to gray, when the end of the day becomes evening (end of day and evening), or during an "air efflux," this rising wind that carries "forever" a message (an "everlasting" wash of air) in Two in the Campagna, stanza V.

=== Treatment ===
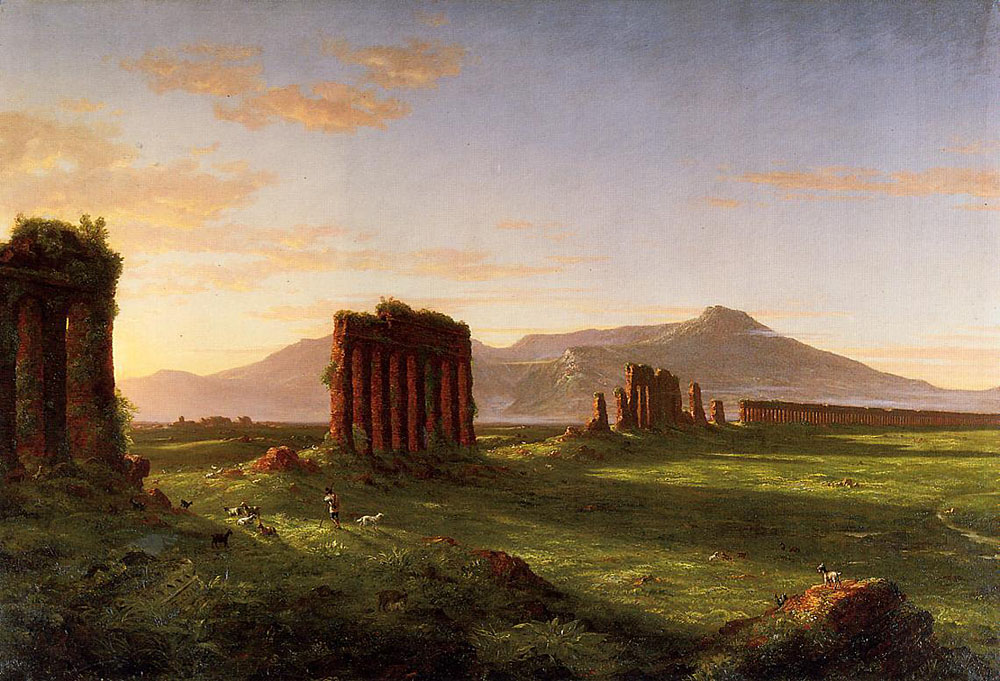
Roman Campagna, by Thomas Cole (1843).

Browning changes his technique depending on whether he is describing a landscape or a detail. In the first case, he is very economical in his means, while in the second, he offers an almost microscopic spectacle.

==== A sketchy setting ====
The setting is usually planted with a simple sketch resembling a list. In By the Fireside, for example, the alpine gorge, chapel, lake, and town are enumerated in black and white. However, in the midst of it, a significant detail appears: "Is it a mill or a forge / Breaking the solitude in vain?" (stanza VII), which suddenly introduces an emotional charge with the idea of solitude being conquered. Gradually, with successive touches of impressionistic nature, the landscape harmonizes with the general mood. Further on, in stanza IX, the metaphor "How sharp are the silver lances that charge / As from the Alps the snows meet the Sky," turns the clouds into lances, which, with their sharp dynamism (sharp, charge), meet the eternal sublime (snow, Heaven). Sometimes, a simple combination of three or four words is enough to indicate the place and time, thus creating an atmosphere: "This morn of Rome and May," in Two in the Campagna, stanza I, line 5.

==== The scurrying of close-ups ====
On the other hand, details can be magnified to the extreme, like under a microscope: Stopford Augustus Brooke cataloged the countless insects and small plants whose bustling fills the close-ups, which Browning particularly enjoyed. Thus, By the Fireside abounds in action verbs applied to the smallest shoots, all driven by a conquering dynamism: they "throw," "drop," "lay," "bulge," "peep," "fret"... (throw, drop, lay, bulged, peep, fret...), in stanzas X to XIII. Elsewhere, nature’s microcosm is revealed as though under a magnifying glass to the reader’s gaze. If from a distance the whole seems dull and gray, the close-up vision brings forth hues of great vigor (glaring hues) that fill the visual field: yellow, orange, gold, crimson, rose, coral, fawn, from stanzas XI to XV of Love Among the Ruins.

==== Symbolism ====
Some symbols are directly borrowed from nature, representing feelings at the epiphanic moment when they are revealed. Thus, the water flowing "cascading over stumps and stones," simultaneous with "[the] moment, unique and infinite" (By the Fireside, stanza XXXVII), or the virgin's thread as thought becomes ephemeral, or the flock's fleece accompanying the vision that calms down, (Two in the Campagna, stanza XXII). Often, the visual images are organized in a functional network meant to prepare or suggest the impact of the theme. Nature is then described and commented on in anthropomorphic terms as if it were a being of flesh and blood. Thus, in addition to the series of action verbs already noted, the formulations humanizing the plants become very precise: "the heart of things," "the splashing of blood," "the pink-flesh mushrooms" (By the Fireside, stanza XIII).

=== Role ===
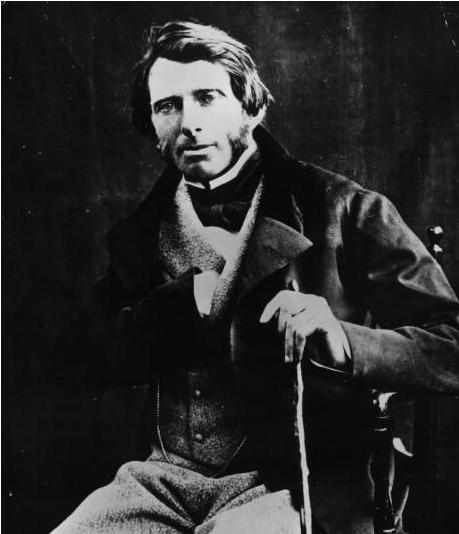
John Ruskin, inventor of the concept of Pathetic fallacy, in 1870.

==== Anthropomorphism ====
In Meeting at Night, stanza I, the ripples forming under the bow of the boat, "surprised and astonished" to have been awakened, express their displeasure through fiery curls. This is not surprising: for Browning, nature is personified both in its appearance and behavior: "See or shut your eyes," said Mother Nature, in her sour tone, "Nothing will bloom, I can't even save my face" (Childe Roland to the Dark Tower Came, stanza XI). She can be pleasing to the eye (By the Fireside) or adorned with the most unpleasant attributes of man—his grimaces, his ulcerations—as in Childe Roland again, stanza XXVI: "Sometimes wandering pustules... / Sometimes patches... substances like boils." She sometimes reveals her character flaws, such as when the little river proves to be "petty" and "vindictive" (stanzas IX-XX). When she is friendly, she displays great imagination in making herself useful. In By the Fireside, chestnuts gather on the lovers' path, the virgin vine offers its "splash of blood," and the poisonous mushroom casts a furtive glance (peeps, stanza XIII). In contrast, in Childe Roland, hatred flushes the landscape with sardonic pleasure, stanza VIII, at the sight of human distress, and the hills wait with sadistic impatience for the squire to be impaled (stabbed to the heft), after being surrounded by the mountains. This anthropomorphization is what John Ruskin called the "pathetic fallacy," a term still used to express the approach of attributing personal feelings to nature. (Note: John Ruskin, in Modern Painters, "Of the Pathetic Fallacy" (1856, iii, 4), defines the "pathetic fallacy" as "to signify any description of inanimate natural objects that ascribes to them human capabilities, sensations, and emotion," reflecting the moods and feelings projected by humans onto nature. A perfect example of the pathetic fallacy is found in the famous apostrophe by Lamartine (1790–1869): Objets inanimés, avez-vous donc une âme / Qui s'attache à notre âme et la force d'aimer? ("Milly ou la Terre natale," Harmonies poétiques et religieuses, book III, ii).)

==== The forces of life ====
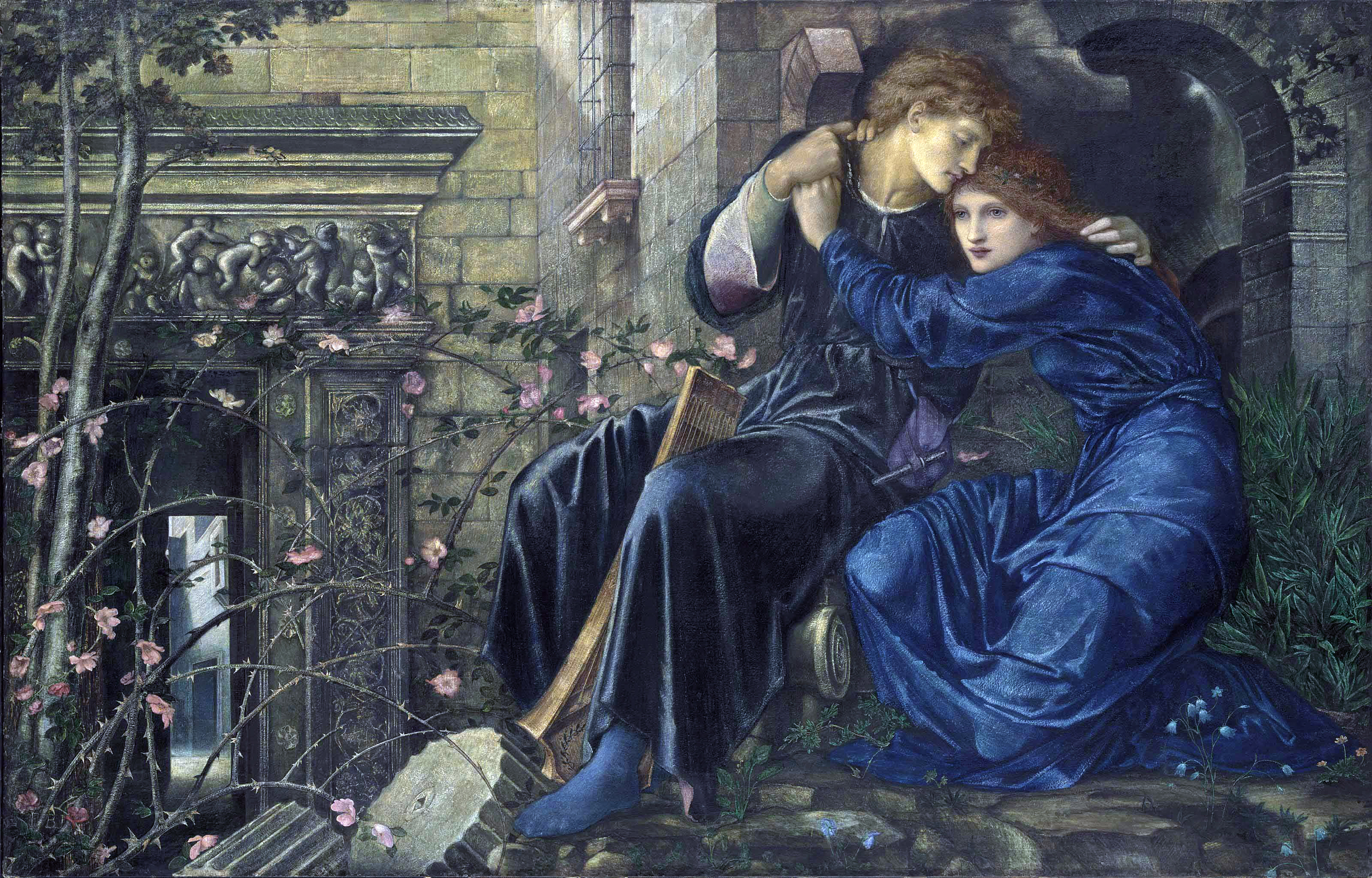
Love among the Ruins, tableau de Edward Burne-Jones.

It is in nature that the forces of life manifest. Like the all-consuming fire, vegetation advances and conquers; roots, stems, and foliage cover, dig, bite, lick. This immense energy is manifested in the lop-sided, the top-heavy, the uncouth, and the rugged. Additionally, ungrateful plants, weeds, thistles, bindweed, and creeping vines often become ubiquitous, with their wriggling insects, especially beetles, and spiders (Love Among the Ruins, By the Fireside, and Two in the Campagna). This anarchic profusion does not correspond to the aesthetic canons of the 19th century, based on order, harmony, and taste. Life is mostly manifest grotesquely, and, as G.K. Chesterton emphasized, building on the analyses of Bagehot and Ruskin, for Browning, this grotesque undoubtedly bears witness to the presence of the divine.

==== Pantheism ====
The pantheism in Browning's poems, which E-D. Forgues describes as "fickle," "falling in love with every spectacle, every music, and divinizing it for the very moment it exerts its influence," is less "outrageous" than Wordsworth’s and less "mystical" than Coleridge’s and Shelley’s. It is manifested in a description of nature as the visible garment of an invisible God, diffused within it. In Saul, David exclaims: "I but open my eyes,--and perfection, no more and no less, / In the kind I imagined, full-fronts me, and God is seen God / In the stars, in the stone, in the flesh, in the soul and the clod" (stanza XVII, verses 247–250); here, it is nature that is entrusted with the task of revealing His law. The poem's conclusion bursts with intense joy at the revelation: "The whole earth was awakened, hell loosed with her crews; / And the stars of night beat with emotion, and tingled and shot / Out in fire the strong pain of pent knowledge: but I fainted not, / For the Hand still impelled me at once and supported, suppressed / All the tumult, and quenched it with quiet, and holy behest, / Till the rapture was shut in itself, and the earth sank to rest." (Saul, stanza XIX, verses 318–323).

==== Intercession ====
In Cleon, Browning presents metaphors endowed with relentless energy and dynamism, but lacking the essential, consciousness. Its role would therefore be limited to intercession; in By the Fireside and Saul, for example, it serves as a catalyst for love in the first, faith in the second, aligning with the artist who, like Fra Lippo Lippi, "interprets God for each of you" (verse 311).

== Love ==
A central theme for Browning, explained by his passionate relationship with Elizabeth Barrett, his wife, love concerns the relationship between man and woman: very little is said about filial (or parental) affection, patriotism, or friendship. What truly interests him is the problem of communication between beings, and more specifically, between beings of the opposite sex. According to Stefan Hawlin, the poems concerned with the theme of love are in Men and Women, Love Among the Ruins, A Lover's Quarrel, A Woman's Last Word, By the Fireside, Any Wife to Any Husband, A Serenade at the Villa, A Pretty Woman, Respectability, A Light Woman, Love in a Life, In a Year, Two in the Campagna, and One Word More. This list is augmented by three titles from Dramatis Personae: James Lee's Wife, Dîs Aliter Visum, and Youth and Art.

=== Attitudes to love ===
There are three main attitudes to love in Browning's works: love-desire or passion, seen in the young people of Love Among the Ruins; love in a state of failure, as in Andrea del Sarto or The Statue and the Bust; and mature love, seen in Two in the Campagna or By the Fireside.

==== Passion of desire ====
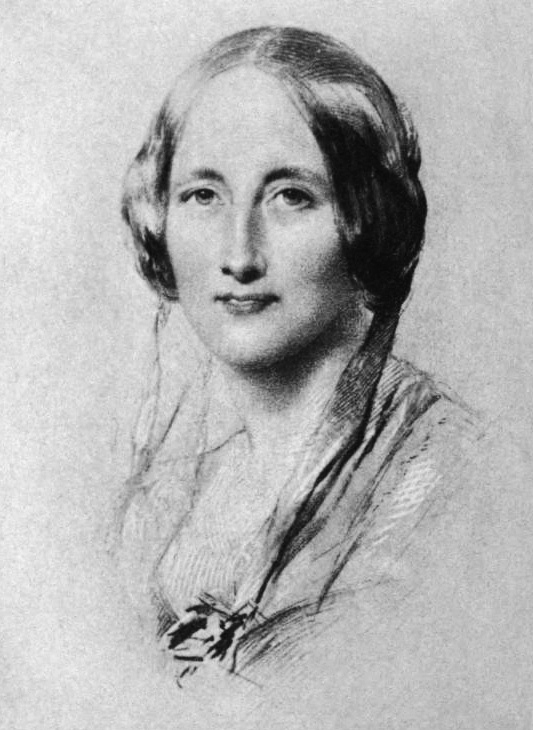
Elizabeth Gaskell, author of Ruth.

Passionate love appears, for example, in Love Among the Ruins, where the protagonists, the shepherd (the speaker with no defined listener) and his beautiful lover, are very young. It is a poem dedicated to desire, expressed by verbs denoting urgency, such as rush and extinguish, as well as the rhythmic scheme that, in counterpoint, evokes an inexorable advance. For this, Browning uses the association of a rhymed dimeter, which delays the punctuation of each hexameter, thus providing a regular echo to the sound of the sheep's bells, marking their progression in the landscape: "Where the quiet-coloured end of evening smiles,/ Miles and miles / On the solitary pastures where our sheep / Half-asleep / Tinkle homeward thro’ the twilight, stray or stop / As they crop —."

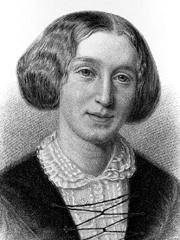
George Eliot, author of Adam Bede.

The passion intensifies in Pippa Passes, where Ottima, the adulterous, seductive, and happy woman ("I am Ottima, beware," she sings, verse 85), is described as "wild" and "animalistic." In this, Browning differs from the Victorian model, where, when prudery and silence do not reign, transgressions, especially those of young girls in novels, almost always lead to tragic consequences—death by suicide, murder, or even the death penalty (Hetty Sorrel in George Eliot's Adam Bede, or Tess in Thomas Hardy's Tess of the d'Urbervilles, Ruth in Elizabeth Gaskell's novel of the same name, though finding the path of repentance and redemption, but by abandoning her happiness for the sole cause of another's). This is also true in poetry, with the treatment of love that Tennyson presents in Enoch Arden, a true antithesis to the myth of the Odyssey, since the hero, Enoch Arden, prefers to remain silent when, after ten years of wandering, he returns to find his wife, who had believed him dead, happily married to his lifelong rival. Nonetheless, this passionate love, though very present in Browning's work, generally illustrates Browning's primary theory, which is summarized in the Spartan formulation of the conclusion of Love Among the Ruins: "Oh heart! oh blood that freezes, blood that burns! / Earth's returns / For whole centuries of folly, noise and sin! / Shut them in, / With their triumphs and their glories and the rest! / Love is best." (stanza VII). The strength of passion represents the elemental manifestation of life, the dynamism of the living world triumphing over the past, and thus over oblivion.

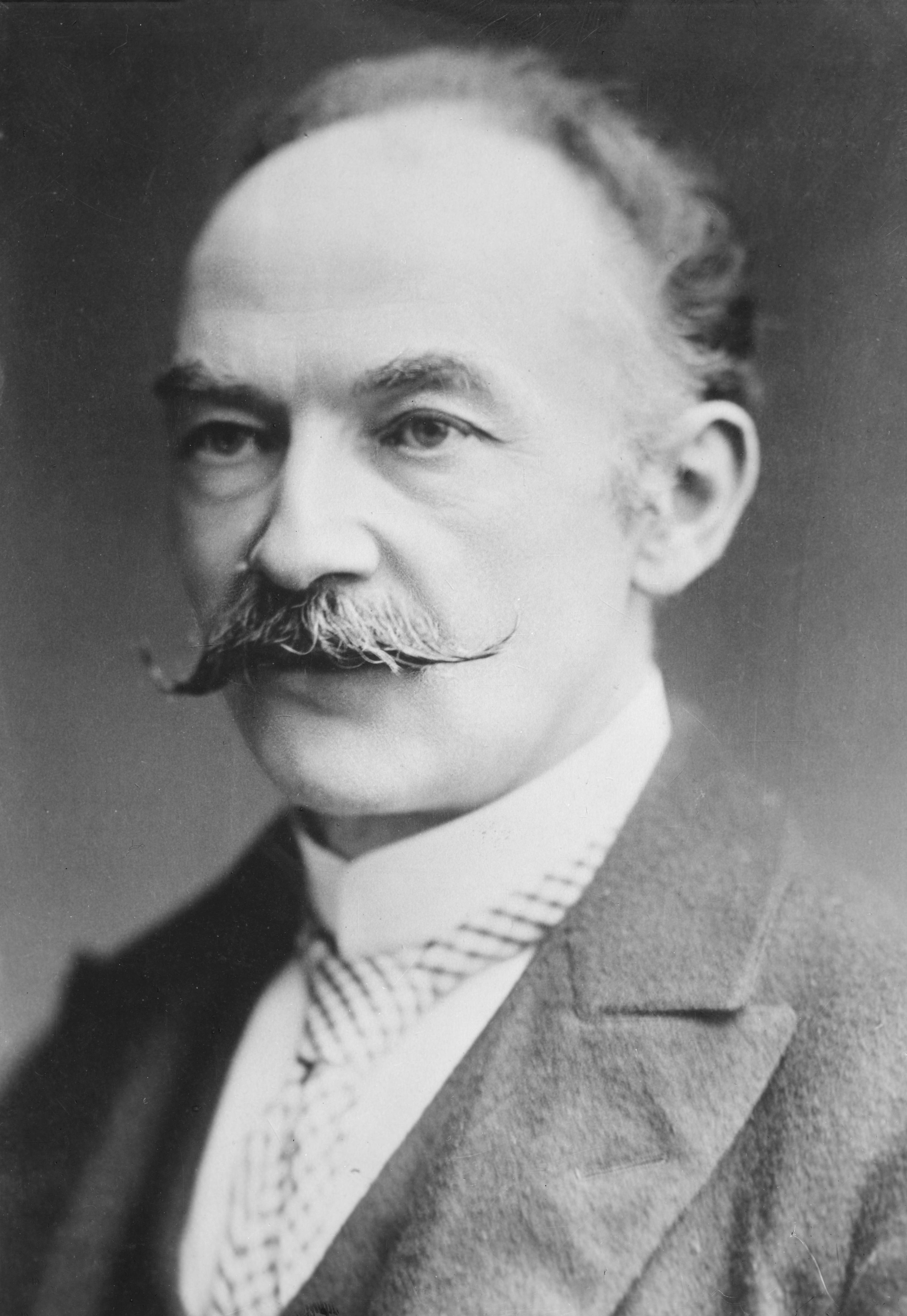
Thomas Hardy, author of Tess of the d'Ubervilles.

The poem A Light Woman, which also belongs to Men and Women, confirms the erotic power of Browning's writing. As John Lucas points out, the speaker, a model of male dignity tinged with unhealthy misogyny towards any sexually active woman, directly addresses the poet: "You, Robert Browning the maker of plays," to offer him his subject, worthy of the power of his verse. For this "maker of plays," it is to sing the redemptive mission of the one who addresses him: to extract an innocent young man from the "snare" and "nets" of a woman of experience ("crossed his path with her hunting-noose / And over him threw her net").

==== The disability of will ====
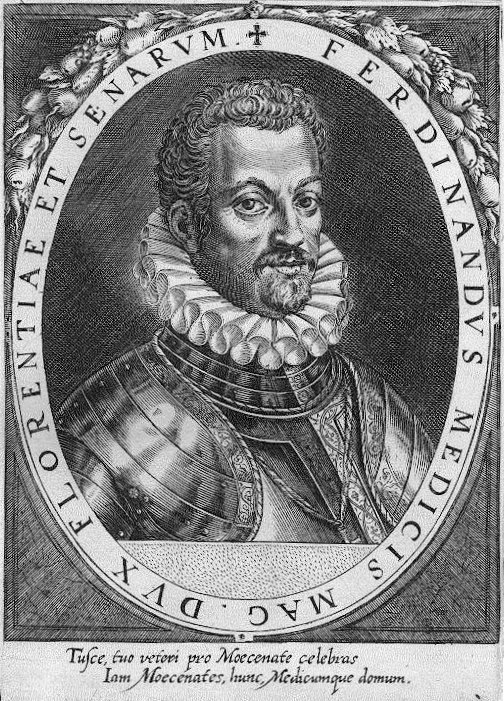
Ferdinand I de' Medici, by Dominicus Custos.

The opposite attitude of love-failure (Browning likes to present the two sides of the same situation, hence his complementary poems in pairs) is illustrated by The Statue and The Bust, written in terza rima, probably in honor of Dante, who used the same metrical scheme in his Divine Comedy and lived, like the speaker, in the city of Florence. The poem evokes the "elective affinities," as described by Goethe, between two people whom society separates. She is the princess promised to another man; he is Grand Duke Ferdinand I, a friend of her future husband. The marriage is celebrated, and the duke and his beloved continue their passion by proxy, he with an equestrian statue, she with the sculpture of a bust. Symbolically and provocatively, the duke placed his statue on the Piazza dell'Annunziata, facing the old Palazzo Riccardi where the woman was imprisoned by her jealous husband, but that is where his audacity ended.

Therefore, the impulses and feelings of each were constantly deferred by procrastination. The infirmity of the will prevented the lovers from taking the step (unlike Browning, who, in contrast, married Elizabeth Barrett) and from doing justice to their being out of respect for social conventions or rather out of fear of the consequences that such audacity would entail: “Thus the months and years accumulated, and ray by ray, / The splendor left their youth and love, / And both of them / They knew they had dreamed a dream,” verses 101 to 103. John Lucas asks the question: “Wouldn’t it have been better, in the end, that it was this way?”. However, the text shows that Browning stands against the dominant morality: adultery, lacking a better option, would not only be acceptable but necessary under certain circumstances.

Had the lovers repented for their passion deemed guilty, had they renounced for moral reasons, the poet would have understood and forgiven them. In contrast, he condemns the lack of courage, sin in his eyes more devastating than the concupiscence that inhabits them: (“The stake our lovers had wagered had lost / Just as much as if it had been legal currency: / And the sin I ascribe to each of these frustrated ghosts // Is… the lamp that remained unlit, the kidney not revealed, / Although, in the end, their goal was flawed, I say / You the virtuous (why do you not unite) / And you, where do you stand? Of you, tale”), (Note: In Horace, after describing the madness of the miser whom he compares to Tantalus, the poet interrupts to say to his supposed interlocutor: Quid rides? mutato nomine, de te / Fabula narratur ("Why do you laugh? If you change the name, the fable speaks of you"), a line that Boileau worked hard to render in six verses for his own Satires. Desmarest proposed to replace his lengthy paraphrase with the following distich: "Tantalus in a river is thirsty and cannot drink; / You laugh, change the name, the fable is your story"; however, Boileau, rejecting the present tense narration, crossed out the correction.) The Statue and the Bust, verses 247 to 250, conclusion of the poem.

==== The married love ====
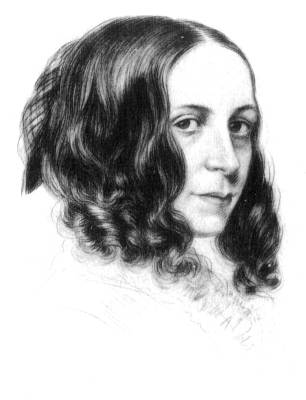
Sketch portrait of Elizabeth Barrett Browning in her youthful maturity.

The reflective love, essentially illustrated, at least in Men and Women, by By the Fireside and Two in the Campagna, is the shared feeling, in marriage, at the age of maturity, between two beings intellectually equal, although Elizabeth Barrett Browning was, until her death, considered superior to her husband. It is manifested in brief moments of intimacy: "My perfect wife, my Leonore" (By the Fireside, XXI), a reference to Leonor's fidelity to her husband, exalted by Beethoven in Fidelio, and also to the very story of Browning with Elizabeth Barrett Browning, his wife. And again, in the same poem: “To see you thus huddle by the fire / Returning, sitting in silence / And contemplate in the light of the flames, this elevated forehead / Supported by your little fairy hand,” (LII). A few gestures of affection, almost casually: “[…] since, hand in hand / We sat in the grass" (Two in the Campagna, Strophe 1), or "[…] I kiss your cheek / Seize the warmth of your soul" (Strophe X, verses 47 and 48). This love, that of the couple, made of both physical attraction and intellectual complicity, Browning constantly proclaims its perpetuity in Prospice, Any Wife to any Husband, and the epilogue of Fifine at the Fair, for "the union [fusion?] of complementary souls cannot be dissolved."

=== Conception of love ===
Different views are expressed, scattered throughout the poems. Sticking to the three major poems of love, Love Among the Ruins, By the Fireside, and Two in the Campagna, some guiding lines emerge.

==== Preeminence ====
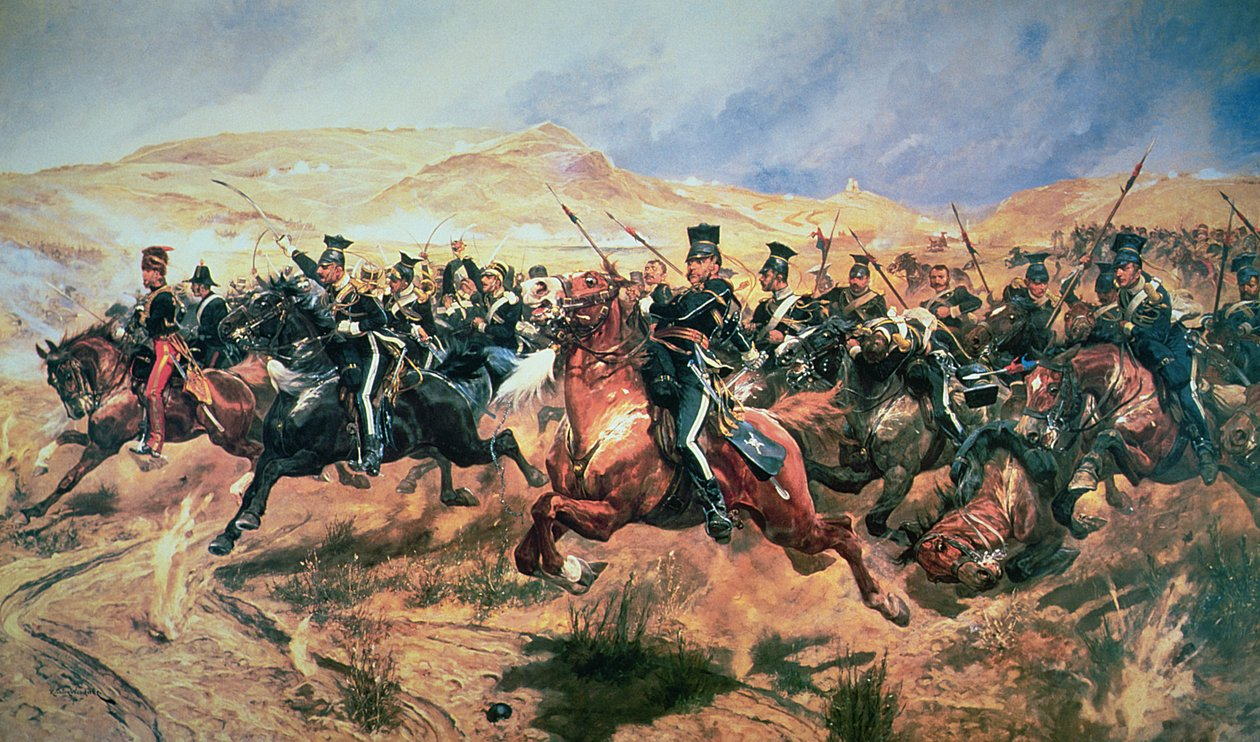
Charge of the Light Brigade, Balaclava, 25 October 1854 (Richard Caton Woodville Jr., 1894)

First, the preeminence of love over civilization, often belligerent and cruel, by which man is characterized. The evocation, in Love Among the Ruins, of past military glories inspires John Lucas to a historical commentary. "It is crucial," he writes, "to notice that Men and Women was published during the Crimean War (October 1853 – February 1856), this example of folly, noise, and sin revealed in the dispatches to The Times from the front of William Howard Russell." For him, the fact that the poem was placed at the beginning of the collection is significant, and the comments from The Athenaeum on the day of publication (17 November 1855) show this (opposition between energy wasted and power misspent on one hand, and chaste and noble fancies on the other). This poem on passion triumphing amid a city defeated and devastated by military force establishes a just scale of values, far from the prevailing warlike rhetoric, and even if this was not Browning's conscious intention, the very presence of Love Among the Ruins at the beginning of a new volume (Men and Women) testifies to his accurate appreciation of things: love remains far more important than pseudo-military glory.

==== The fusion of bodies and souls ====
The ultimate goal is not the union of hearts, which proves necessary but not sufficient: “Two lives that add together, and often, it is the scar / One next to the other, it’s too far,” (By the Fireside, XLVI), or “To see with your eyes, / The beating of my heart in harmony / With yours, and drink to satiety from the fountains of your mind,” Two in the Campagna, verse 9. Browning expresses the idea of the "infinitesimal difference": the beings attracted to each other may or may not meet: “Oh, this little more, and what wealth! / And this little less, it’s a lost universe,” (By the Fireside, XXXIX). When this difference fades, union may become fusion: “Finally, we were mixed / Despite the mortal envelope,” (By the Fireside, XLVII). Then, the revelation of love leads to a rebirth: “I am named and known by the achievement of this moment, / It is here I gained my posture and my status / He who was born to love you, my sweet” (LI), and “Thus, the earth gained one more man” (LIII).

==== The "good minute" ====
There exists a “good minute” leading to the “right choice.” If the right choice is made, the opportunity seized, its fruits are eternal: “Oh, moment, unique and infinite!” (By the Fireside, XXXVII), or “As everything we perceive and know / Tends thus toward the result of a moment / When a soul declares itself, yes, / By the fruit—what it produces!” (XLIX). Conversely, when indecision or negligence sets in, the “good minute” slips away: “I pick the rose / And love it more than words can say / And pass the good minute” (Two in the Campagna, Strophe X), and this, as in The Statue and the Bust, in a dramatic way, hearts falling into desolation from themselves, from their love, from their lost past and vanished future. This is the conclusion of the poem, verses 247 to 250, cited and translated above, regarding the love-failure ("The infirmity of the will" in the section "Attitudes of Love"). (Note: John Lucas also sees in the speaker of Two in the Campagna a rather pompous young man who constantly complains: his beloved is not on his level, nor is he on hers. The union he had promised has long been extinguished. The poem, a "self-congratulatory introspection," would therefore express "male frustration," according to Lucas 2003, p. 54.)

==== The woman, "mediator of the absolute" ====
Jean-Michel Yvard, questioning the role of women in Victorian poetry, explains that in Browning's work, she is the object "of a pure and inaccessible love that remains fundamentally directed toward God, with mystical quest and amorous aspiration being often indistinguishable in his poems. Therefore, from a certain point of view, there was nothing radically new here, as the woman continued, including and especially in the Victorian era, to be the mediator of the absolute and to facilitate access to transcendence rather than directly substitute for it."

=== Lyrical style ===
==== A discreet lyricism of feeling ====
There is no melodrama or pathos in Browning, but restraint manifests itself through several levels of transposition: that of memory, that of anonymous disguise (cf. Two in the Campagna: "A man speaks"), that of geographical and/or historical displacement. The lyricism relies on themes close to those of romanticism: passion, fusion, solitude, and is constantly associated with nature, no longer a confidante as often in the Romantics (Wordsworth, Coleridge, Keats, Shelley, Lamartine, Victor Hugo, Musset, Vigny, etc.), but an actor in the elaboration or continuation of feelings, and it arises during meditations at key moments in the discourse, as in the conclusion of Two in the Campagna, where, in two lines, the weight of the condition of love is condensed: “The infinite passion and suffering / Of the ardent finitude of hearts,” Strophe XII. Moreover, this lyricism is often expressed through symbols: thus, in By the Fireside, words (nouns or verbs), verbal associations refer to femininity: coral nipple, bulged, Strophe XIII, woman-country, male-lands, Strophe VI. Here, Browning approaches poetry that foreshadows symbolism.

==== A verve of writing never denied ====
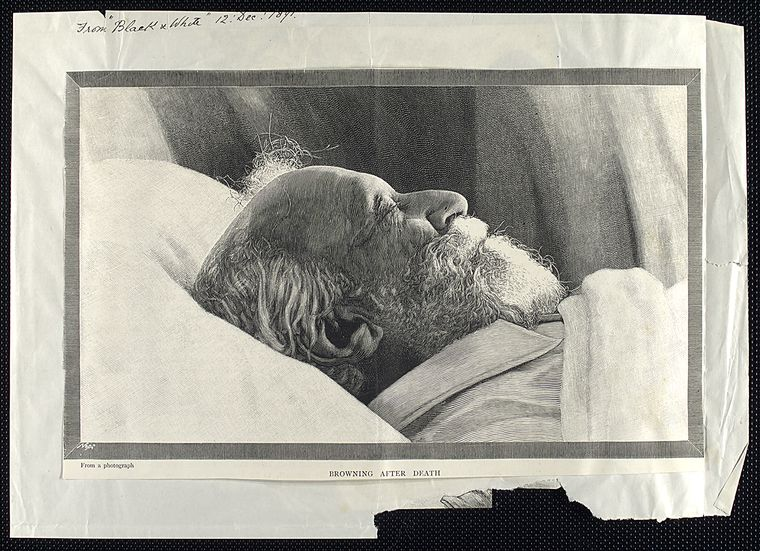
Robert Browning on his deathbed.

Assolando, a collection published on the same day as the poet's death, still demonstrates an unparalleled vitality for a 78-year-old man, particularly in the poem Muckle-Mouth Meg, a reunion with a story that Walter Scott had made famous in his Tales of a Grandfather (1828). It tells of an Englishman who will escape the scaffold if he agrees to marry Meg-with-the-very-large-mouth (muckle, a variant of mickle, means "very large"). He refuses, finding Meg's mouth far too disturbing, as it can swallow a bubblejock's egg (Bubblejock is the Scottish term for turkey). "And I would let this mouth chew mine? Never, my dear!" John Lucas sees in the fact that the poet still took pleasure, in his old age, in writing such an exuberant poem as Muckle-Mouth Meg, "something joyously reassuring."

== Place of Browning's theme in literature ==
In his 2001 essay on Browning, Peter Porter notes that Browning's influence was negligible in his time, that he had no immediate disciple, except for Eugene Lee Hamilton (1845–1907), a writer of Petrarchan sonnets, but that "the bomb was delayed," as it manifested strongly in the 1920s. Poets such as Ezra Pound, T. S. Eliot, and Robert Frost drew mainly from his conception of the dramatic monologue, but, according to Lucas, novelists gradually borrowed from his thematic approach.

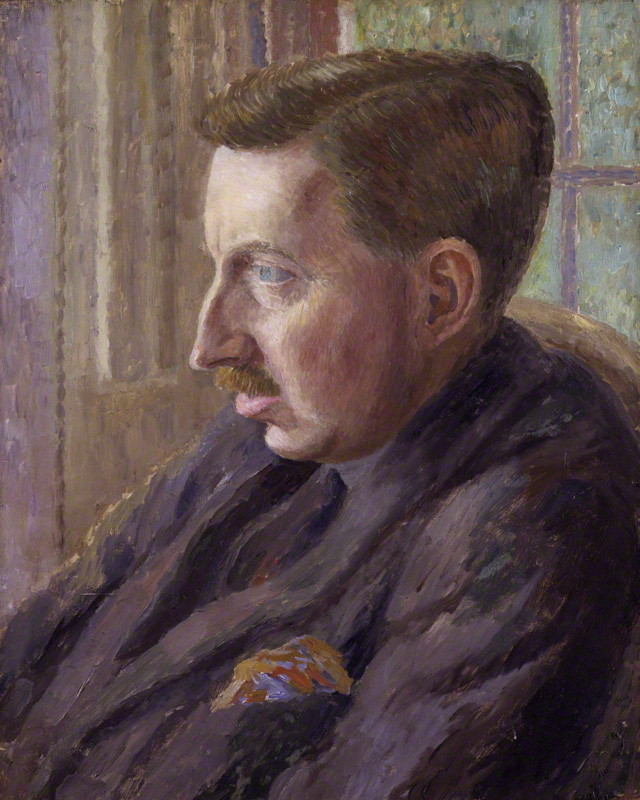
E. M. Forster in 1924, by Dora Carrington.

Already in 1855, with the publication of Men and Women, George Eliot praised in an article for the Westminster Review his "sharp eye that pierces the secrets of the human character [which he reveals] not through a process of dissection, but through dramatic painting," adding that "Fra Lippo Lippi, by itself, was worth an essay on realism in art, and that The Statue and the Bust was far preferable to a three-volume work with the same moral." Perhaps more importantly is the fact that her Grancourt, the husband of Gwendolen Harcourt in Daniel Deronda, is directly borrowed from the Duke of Ferrara in My Last Duchess, sharing, though without the murder, the "same marital absolutism," as expressed by Graham Handley, a recent editor of George Eliot's works. A similar influence, though his sadism is directed toward extreme aestheticism, is seen in Henry James' Osmond in Portrait of a Lady, who collects human beings as art objects: his wife will be, in his eyes, nothing but "the portrait of a lady." Lucas detects traces of the same "egoism" in Cecil Vyse from E. M. Forster's A Room with a View, who demands that his fiancée conform to his ideal of beauty.

Another influence rarely highlighted is that of The Pied Piper of Hamelin (May 1842), written for the eldest son of the actor Macready, then bedridden. This "Story for Children," as indicated by its subtitle, marks a turning point in children's literature, which had begun, with Romanticism, to break away from the overly cautious 18th-century fairy tales. While the poem has its moral ("keep your word"), it is delivered "tongue-in-cheek," with "one last joke" in the conclusion, ending on such an artificial rhyme, promised [i], forced to rhyme with mice [ai], that according to Lucas, it is "a final wink at children's humor."

== Robert Browning's theme in culture ==
=== Literature ===
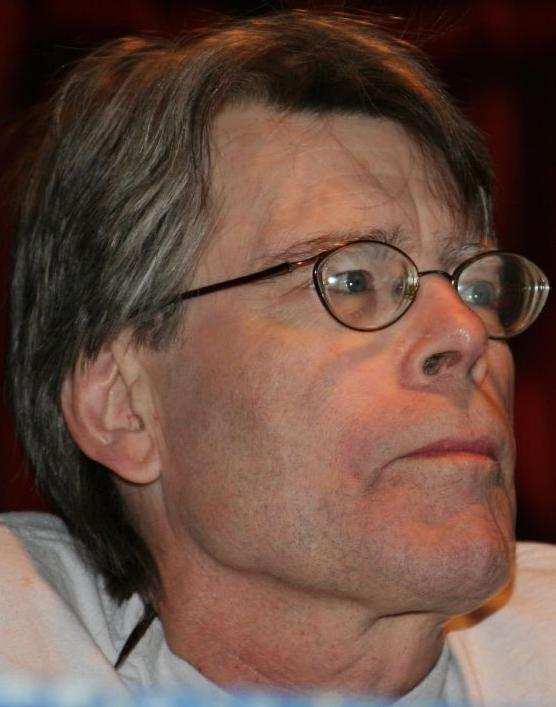
- Stephen King, in 2007, who drew inspiration from Browning for Dark Tower.
  The last two lines of the famous "Song" from Pippa Passes—"God's in His heaven / All's right with the world!"—are parodied in Aldous Huxley's Brave New World with the hypnopaedic slogan: "Ford is a failure, all's very well in the world."
- The Big Sun of Mercury by Isaac Asimov was originally titled Grow Old With Me. As the author explained in The Early Asimov, this title comes from a quotation from Robert Browning's poem Rabbi Ben Ezra.
- Stephen King drew inspiration from Robert Browning's poem Childe Roland to the Dark Tower Came for his 2005 novel The Dark Tower.

=== Painting ===
Robert Browning's work inspired several painters, such as Edward Burne-Jones, whose painting Love among the Ruins bears the title of a poem from Men and Women.

=== Music ===
- By the Fireside is one of the sections of The Seasons, a piano suite composed by Tchaikovsky in 1875 and 1876.
- In 1912, Charles Ives composed a symphonic overture entitled Robert Browning Overture. (Note: Charles Ives wrote of this overture, the only one he completed: the themes themselves, except the second main theme, were trying to catch the Browning surge into the baffling unknowables, not afraid of unknown fields, not sticking to nice main roads, and so not exactly bound up to one key or keys (or any tonality for that matter) all the time.)
- Steve Hewitt composed and released the first extract from Love Among Ruin, inspired by Robert Browning's poem Love Among the Ruins, on 28 November 2009.
- By the Fireside is the pseudonym of English alternative rock singer Daniel Lea.

=== Cinema, television, miscellaneous ===
In the cinematic field, numerous films have been made based on the work of Robert Browning and his themes:

- Pipa passes, or, The Song of Conscience (1909), film directed by D. W. Griffith;
- Women and Roses (1914), film directed by Wallace Reid;
- The Ring and the Book (1914);
- The Flight of the Duchess (1916), film by Eugene Nowland;
- The Pied Piper of Hamelin is Robert Browning's most frequently adapted work for the screen:
  - 1911 film, directed by Theodore Marston,
  - 1913 film, directed by George Lessey,
  - 1926 film, directed by Frank Tilley,
  - 1957 film, directed by Bretaigne Windust,
  - 1960 film, directed by Lotte Reiniger,
  - 1972 film, directed by Jacques Demy,
  - 1982 film, directed by Brian Cosgrove,
  - 1985 film, directed by Nicholas Meyer;
- Jean-Luc Godard, in Pierrot le Fou (1965), has Jean-Paul Belmondo and Anna Karina recite the poem "Une vie dans un amour" from the collection Men and Women;
- in the American-Canadian science-fiction TV series X-Files (September 1993 – May 2002), detective Fox Mulder recites an extract from Robert Browning's Paracelsus in the meadow where Celsmoon died.

== Poetic works ==
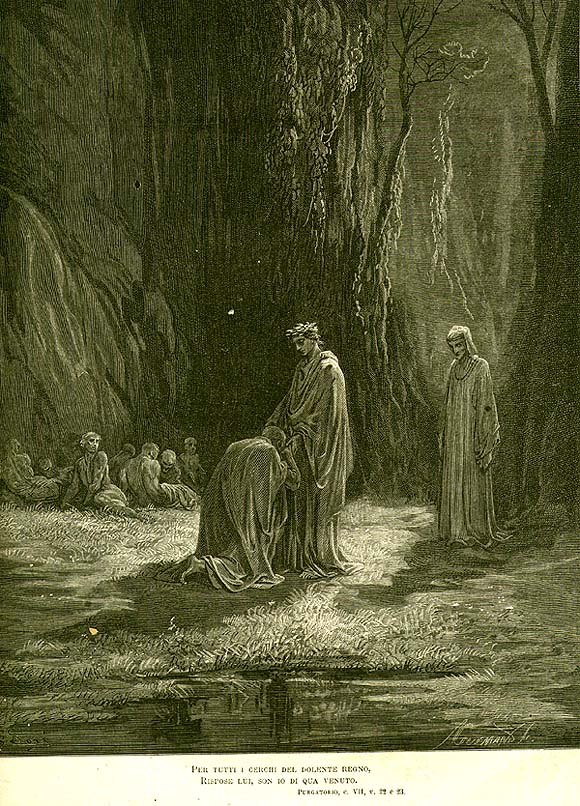
The troubadour Sordello, by Gustave Doré.

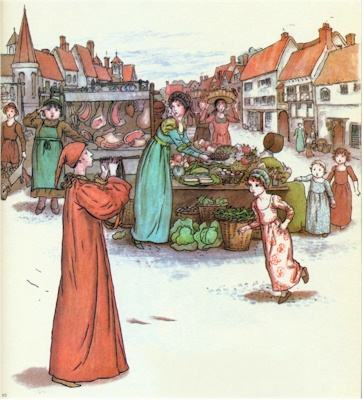
Kate Greenaway: The Pied Piper of Hamelin.

The works cited here are those used in the text of the article.

Works in text

- Pauline: A Fragment of a Confession (1833)
- Paracelsus (1835)
- Sordello (1840)
- Bells and Pomegranates, No. I, Pippa Passes (1841)
- Bells and Pomegranates, No. III, Dramatic Lyrics (1842)
  - Porphyria's Lover
  - Soliloquy of the Spanish Cloister
  - My Last Duchess
  - The Pied Piper of Hamelin
  - Johannes Agricola in Meditation
- Bells and Pomegranates No. VII, Dramatic Romances and Lyrics (1845)
  - How They Brought the Good News from Ghent to Aix
  - The Bishop Orders His Tomb at Saint Praxed's Church
- Christmas-Eve and Easter-Day (1850)
- Men and Women (1855)
  - Love Among the Ruins
  - Two in the Campagna
  - The Last Ride Together
  - A Toccata of Galuppi's
  - Childe Roland to the Dark Tower Came
  - Fra Lippo Lippi
  - Andrea del Sarto
  - A Grammarian's Funeral
  - An Epistle Containing the Strange Medical Experience of Karshish, the Arab Physician
- Dramatis Personae (1864)
  - Abt Vogler
  - Caliban upon Setebos
  - Rabbi Ben Ezra
- The Ring and the Book (1868–1869)
- Aristophanes' Apology (1875)
- The Agamemnon of Aeschylus, (1877)
- Dramatic Idylls, (1879)
- Dramatic Idylls, Second Series, (1880)
- Parleyings with Certain People of Importance in Their Day (1887)
- Asolando (1889)

== See also ==
- Robert Browning
- Dramatic monologue
- Men and Women (poetry collection)
- Soliloquy of the Spanish Cloister
- Porphyria's Lover
- Johannes Agricola in Meditation
- My Last Duchess
- Fra Lippo Lippi (poem)
- Andrea del Sarto
- A Toccata of Galuppi's
- Childe Roland to the Dark Tower Came
- Love Among the Ruins (poem)
- The Ring and the Book
