= Men and Women (poetry collection) =

Collection of poems by Robert Browning

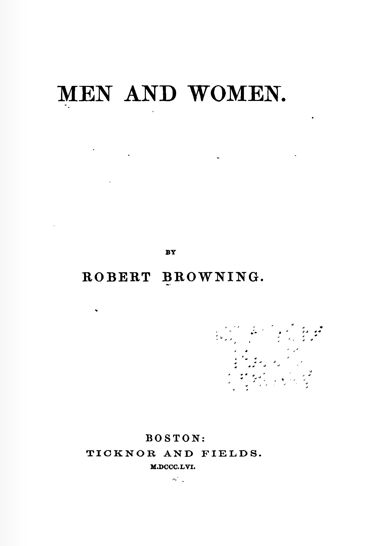
- Cover, circa 1856
- Author: Robert Browning
- Language: English
- Genre: Poetry.
- Publication date: 1855 (first edition in two volumes), book of poetry destructured from 1863 (reduced to 13 pieces including only eight from the 1855 edition) but published under the same title
- Publication place: United Kingdom

Men and Women is a collection of fifty-one poems in two volumes by Robert Browning, first published in 1855. While now generally considered to contain some of the best of Browning's poetry, at the time it was not received well and sold poorly.

== Background information ==
Men and Women was Browning's first published work after a five-year hiatus, and his first collection of shorter poems since his marriage to Elizabeth Barrett in 1846. His reputation had still not recovered from the disastrous failure of Sordello fifteen years previously, and Browning was at the time comprehensively overshadowed by his wife in terms of both critical reception and commercial success. Away from the spotlight, Browning was able to work on a long-considered project. He had long been associated with the dramatic monologue, having written two early volumes of poems entitled Dramatic Lyrics and Dramatic Romances and Lyrics, but with Men and Women he took the concept a step further.

Browning's Men and Women consists of fifty-one poems, all of which are monologues spoken by different narrators, some identified and some not; the first fifty take in a very diverse range of historical, religious or European situations, with the fifty-first – "One Word More" – featuring Browning himself as narrator and dedicated to his wife. The title of the collection came from a line in her Sonnets from the Portuguese. Browning himself was very fond of the collection, referring to the poems as "My fifty men and women" (from the opening line in One Word More), and today, Men and Women has been described as one of Victorian England's most significant books.

== Transcendentalism – A Poem in Twelve Volumes ==
Thirteen years after the publication of Men and Women, Browning revisited the first edition, and made a reclassification of it. He separated the simpler rhymed presentations of an emotional moment, such as Mesmerism and A Woman's Last Word, or the picturesque rhymed verse telling a story of an experience, such as Childe Roland and The Statue and the Bust, from their more complex companions, such as Cleon, Fra Lippo, and Rudel. The resulting collection of only twelve poems is typically found today in many abridged editions of Men and Women, and in the somewhat more accurately titled volume, Transcendentalism: A Poem In Twelve Volumes.

== Poems in the collection ==
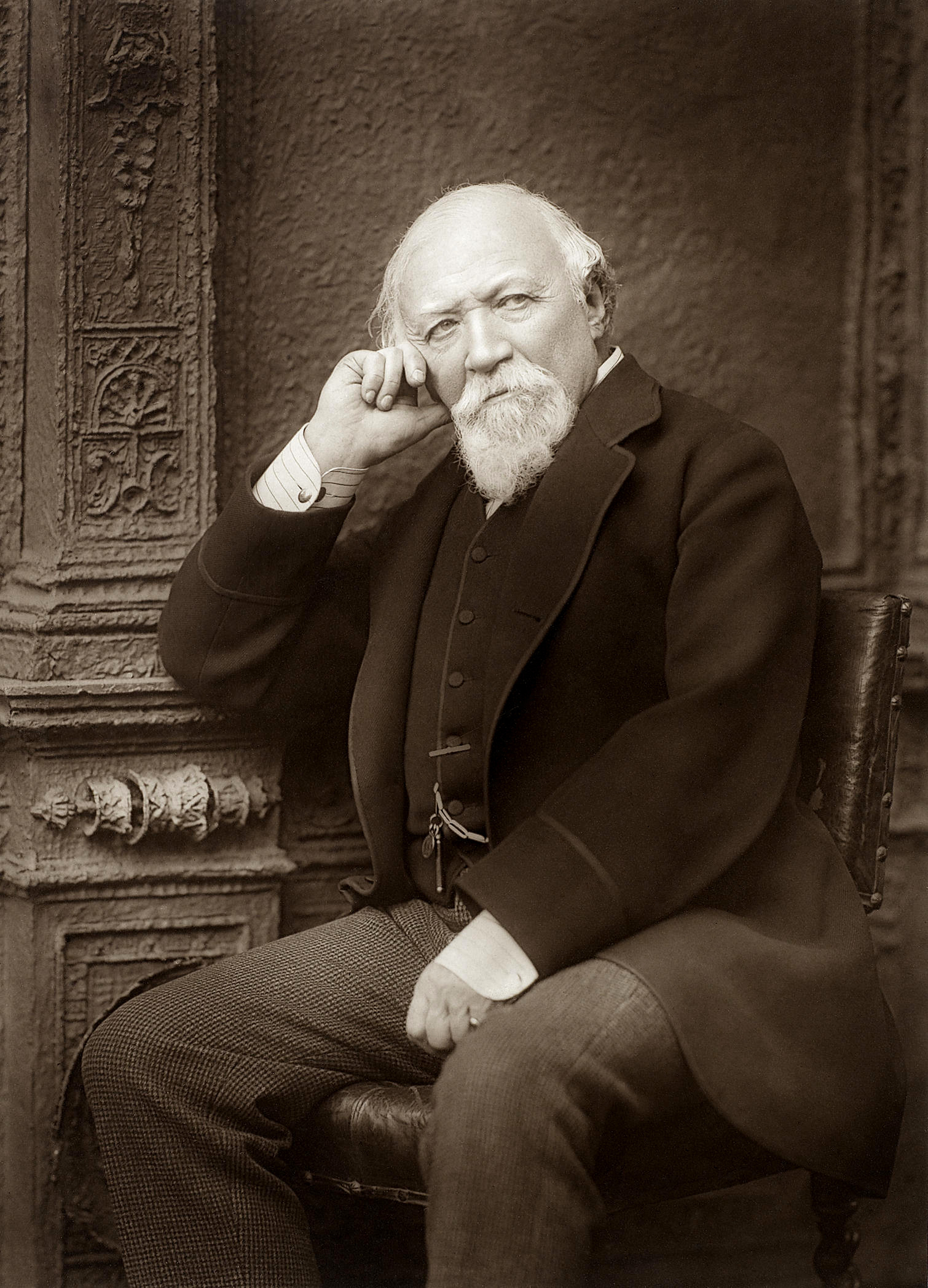
Robert Browning

- "Love Among the Ruins"
- "A Lover’s Quarrel"
- "Evelyn Hope"
- "Up at a Villa – Down in the City"
- "A Woman’s Last Word"
- "Fra Lippo Lippi"
- "A Toccata of Galuppi's"
- "By the Fire-Side"
- "Any Wife to Any Husband"
- "An Epistle Containing the Strange Medical Experience of Karshish, the Arab Physician"
- "Mesmerism"
- "A Serenade at the Villa"
- "My Star"
- "Instans Tyrannus"
- "A Pretty Woman"
- "Childe Roland to the Dark Tower Came"
- "Respectability"
- "A Light Woman"
- "The Statue and the Bust"
- "Love in a Life"
- "Life in a Love"
- "How It Strikes a Contemporary"
- "The Last Ride Together"
- "The Patriot"
- "Master Hugues of Saxe-Gotha"
- "Bishop Blougram’s Apology"
- "Memorabilia"
- "Andrea del Sarto"
- "Before"
- "After"
- "In Three Days"
- "In a Year"
- "Old Pictures in Florence"
- "In a Balcony"
- "Saul"
- "De Gustibus—"
- "Women and Roses"
- "Protus"
- "Holy-Cross Day"
- "The Guardian-Angel"
- "Cleon"
- "The Twins"
- "Popularity"
- "The Heretic’s Tragedy"
- "Two in the Campagna"
- "A Grammarian’s Funeral"
- "One Way of Love"
- "Another Way of Love"
- "Transcendentalism - A Poem in Twelve Volumes"
- "Misconceptions"
- "One Word More"

== See also ==
- Victorian literature
- Dramatic poetry
- Robert Browning
- Elizabeth Barrett Browning
- Thematic focus of Robert Browning poetic work

== Bibliography ==
- R. Browning, Hommes et Femmes (Men and Women), Collection bilingue des classiques étrangers, Aubier, éditions Montaigne, Paris, 1938, 341 pages. Translation and introduction with additional bibliographical notes in 74 pages (I to LXXIV) by Louis Cazamian, professor of modern literature and civilization of England at the Sorbonne. (Bilingual collection of the first edition)
- William Clyde de Vane, A Browning Handbook, Crofts, New-York, 1935, in particular the section concerning Men and women from page 185 to page 246.
- Selected Poems of Robert Browning, edited with introduction and notes by George Herbert Clarke (1873-1953), Houghton Mifflin, Boston, 1927, 334 pages.
