= Evelyn Hope =

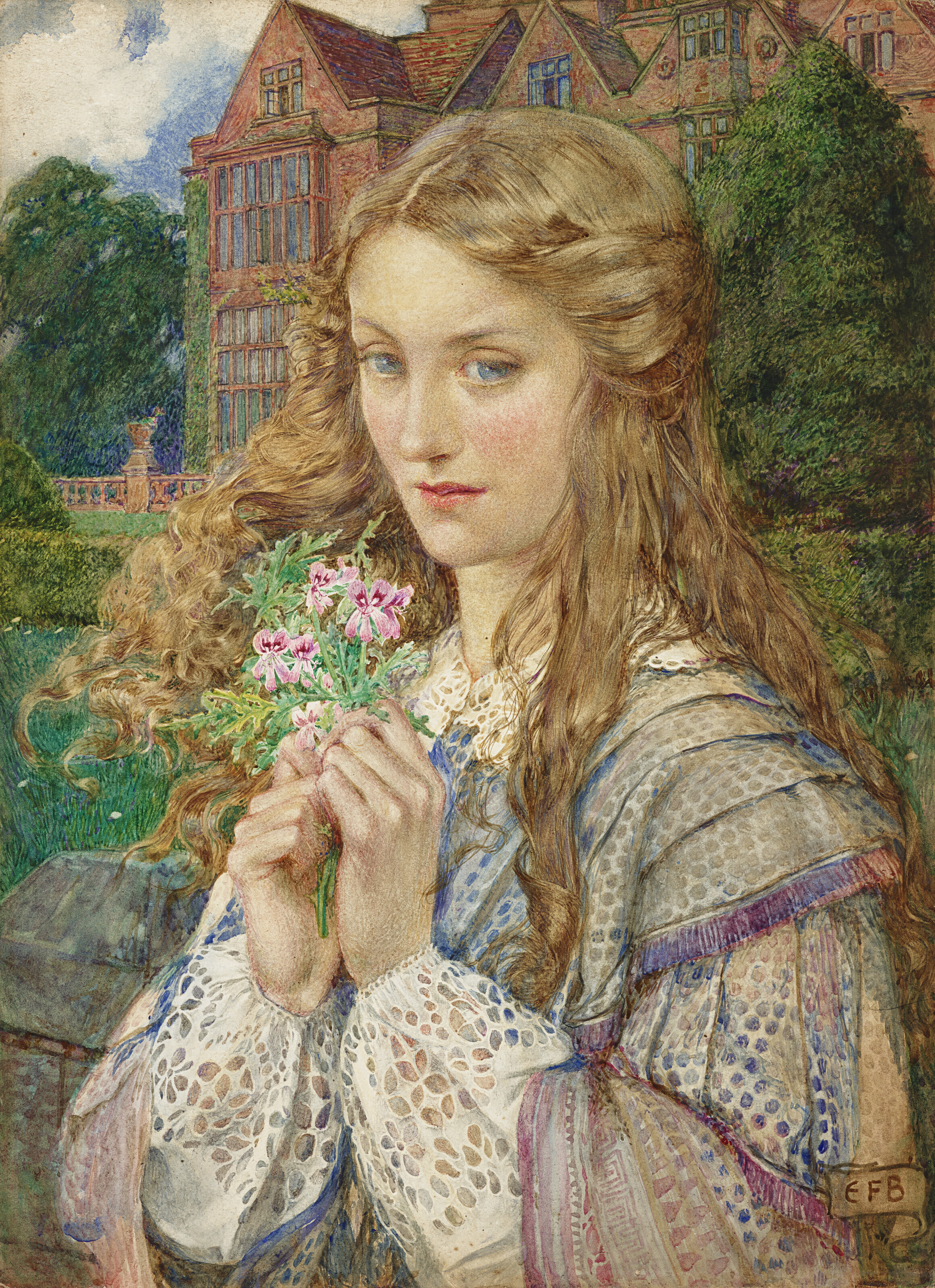
Watercolor painting of Evelyn Hope by Eleanor Fortescue-Brickdale, 1908

"Evelyn Hope" is a poem written by Robert Browning in his work "Men and Women", 1855.

George Saintsbury writes in his History of Nineteenth Century Literature,

It is as a lyric poet that Browning ranks highest; and in this highest class it is impossible to refuse him all but the highest rank, in some few cases the very highest. He understood love pretty thoroughly; and when a lyric poet understands love thoroughly there is little doubt of his position." In the list of Browning's best love lyrics, Evelyn Hope (first published in "Men and Women", 1855) takes a very high rank as one of the most musical and tender. The theme is that of a love which, from its conditions, could not be reciprocated, yet would prove undying.

Author Lucy Maud Montgomery used two lines from this poem as the epigraph for her novel Anne of Green Gables: "The good stars met in your horoscope, Made you of spirit and fire and dew." There was one slight modification in that the original poem read "made you of spirit, fire, and dew."
