= Love Among the Ruins (poem) =

1855 poem by Robert Browning

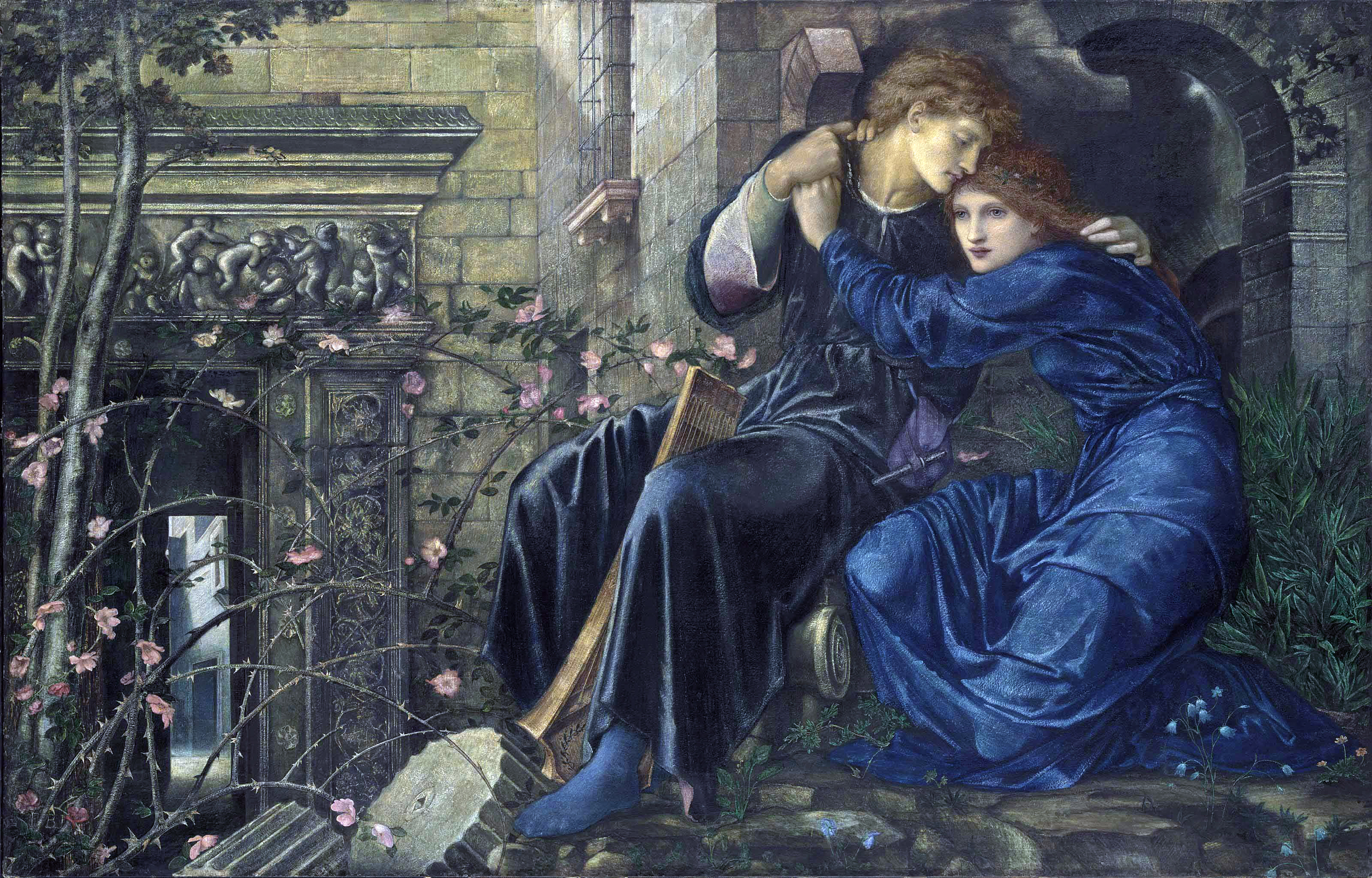
Love Among the Ruins, watercolour by Edward Burne-Jones, circa 1873

"Love Among the Ruins" is an 1855 poem by Robert Browning. It is the first poem in the collection Men and Women.

== Overview ==
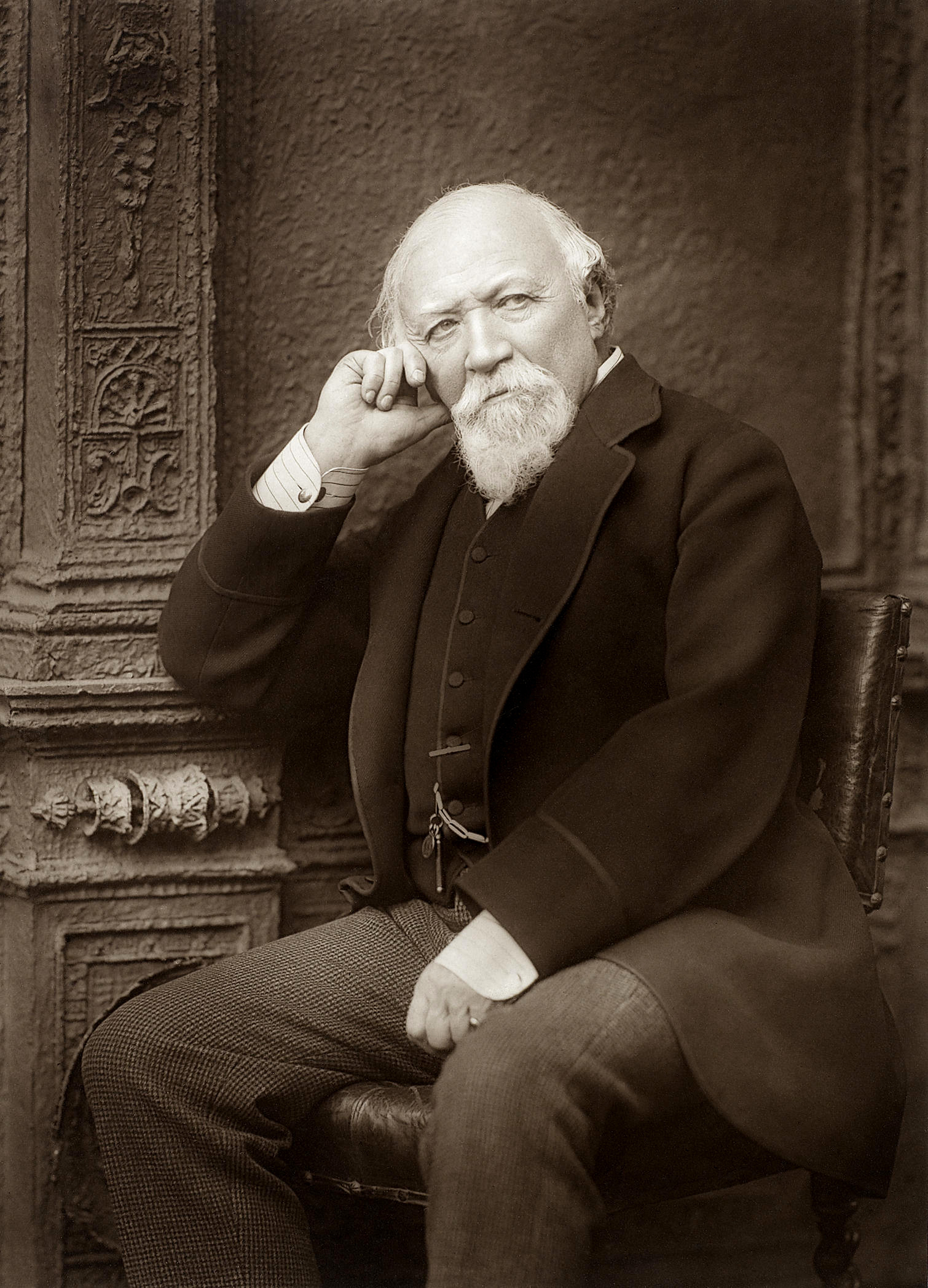
The poet, Robert Browning

The poem begins:

Where the quiet-coloured end of evening smiles,
Miles and miles
On the solitary pastures where our sheep
Half-asleep
Tinkle homeward thro' the twilight, stray or stop
As they crop—
Was the site once of a city great and gay,
(So they say)
Of our country's very capital, its prince
Ages since
Held his court in, gathered councils, wielding far
Peace or war.

— Stanza I

Browning here employs an unusual structure of rhyming couplets in which long trochaic lines are paired with short lines of three syllables. This may be related to the theme of the poem, a comparison between love and material glory. The speaker, overlooking a pasture where sheep graze, recalls that once a great ancient city, his country's capital, stood there. After spending four stanzas describing the beauty and grandeur of the ancient city, the speaker says that "a girl with eager eyes and yellow hair/Waits me there", and that "she looks now, breathless, dumb/Till I come." The speaker, after musing further on the glory of the city and thinking of how he will greet his lover, closes by rejecting the majesty of the old capital and preferring instead his love:

Oh heart! oh blood that freezes, blood that burns!
Earth's returns
For whole centuries of folly, noise and sin!
Shut them in,
With their triumphs and their glories and the rest!
Love is best.

— from stanza VII

== In culture ==
Browning's poem inspired or gave its title to many subsequent works, including a painting by Edward Burne-Jones, Warwick Deeping's second novel, a 1953 novel by Evelyn Waugh, a 1975 TV-movie with Katharine Hepburn and Laurence Olivier, an episode of the American TV series Mad Men, and an album and song by the band 10,000 Maniacs.

The poem is quoted by the character Rupert Birkin in Women in Love, a novel by D. H. Lawrence.
