= In a Balcony =

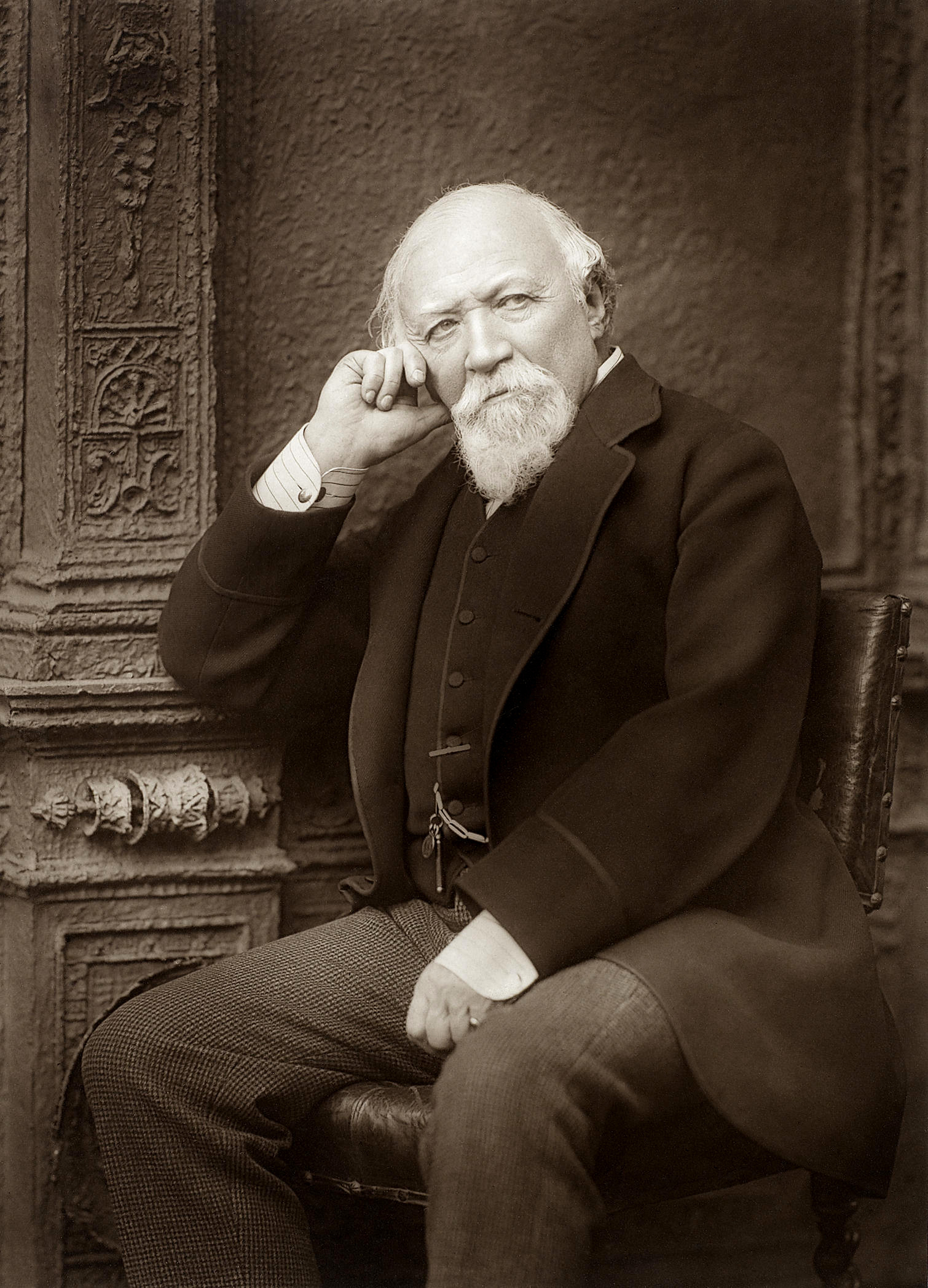
Author Robert Browning

In a Balcony is a one-act play written by Robert Browning. It was written in 1853 in Bagni di Lucca, making it his last play. It was originally published in 1855 in Men and Women and was probably not intended to be performed.

== Characters ==
- Constance
- Norbert
- Queen
