= A Toccata of Galuppi's =

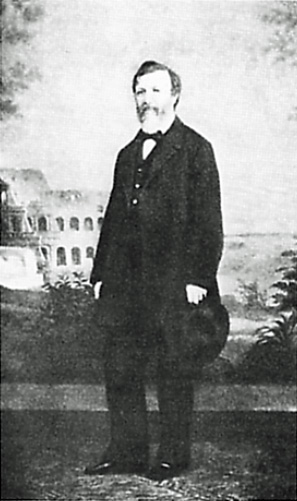
Browning in Rome, 1861

"A Toccata of Galuppi's" is a poem by Robert Browning, originally published in the 1855 collection Men and Women. The title refers to the fact that the speaker is either playing or listening to a toccata by the 18th-century Venetian composer Baldassare Galuppi. The poem consists of fifteen rhymed tercets; its prevailing meter is trochaic octameter catalectic.

== Musical background ==
It is not known whether Browning was thinking of any one piece by Galuppi; in Galuppi's time, the terms "toccata" and "sonata" were less clearly differentiated than they later became, and were used interchangeably. A number of Galuppi's sonatas have been suggested as Browning's inspiration, but as Charles van den Borren wrote in The Musical Times, "every poet has the right to evade the prosaic minutiae of fact", and it is impossible to state with confidence that one Galuppi piece has more claim than another to be the inspiration for the poem.

Commentators have remarked on the musicality of the poem. Browning was trained extensively in music, both in composition and musical theory. Professional musicians and musicologists have been dismissive of his use of musical terms, but the music scholar Deryck Cooke writes of the poet's precise grasp of fine musical detail in this work. David Parkinson identifies "a link between each syllable of the poem and the musical notes of a scale." Stephen H. Ford contends that the whole poem is constructed "on a double octave form". Marc R. Plamondon argues that Browning's subjective interpretation produces "not just a commentary on music, but a complex portrait of the person attempting to interpret the music." The critic Robert C. Schweik argues that the poem does not require the reader to know Galuppi's music, and that Browning does not provide any description of what the music is really like.

== Themes ==
The poem is written in the first person, but the voice is not that of Browning himself: the speaker, unlike the poet, has never been out of England, and is picturing life in 18th-century Venice through his response to Galuppi's music. Schweik comments that the speaker's remarks on Venice include "typical bits and snatches of commonplace, second-hand information" and "misunderstandings that would be characteristic of an Englishman who really knows very little about Venice." The speaker, more interested in science than the arts, even gives Galuppi the wrong first name ("Baldassaro" for the correct "Baldassare", an error perpetuated by some literary critics).

After the speaker's fanciful and superficial evocation of old Venice, in stanzas I to IX, the voice goes on to muse on the nature of immortality, first of art and then of life itself. In stanza X, the speaker ponders on the deaths of Galuppi's original audiences, and in the following stanzas he contemplates his own mortality. By the final stanza, XV, the speaker has come so far from his original complacency as to have real empathy with the people of 18th-century Venice.

== Musical settings ==
The poem inspired a 1989 setting, in modern idiom but with musical quotations from Galuppi's works, by the composer Dominick Argento. The singer-songwriter Kris Delmhorst based her song "Galuppi Baldassare", the first track of her 2006 album Strange Conversation on the poem, using many of the words and theme as a basis for her own lyrics.

== See also ==
- When the Kissing had to Stop – the title is a quotation from this poem
- Thematic focus of Robert Browning poetic work
