= Love Among the Ruins. A Romance of the Near Future =

1953 novel by Evelyn Waugh

Love Among the Ruins: A Romance of the Near Future
- First UK edition
- Author: Evelyn Waugh
- Language: English
- Publisher: Chapman & Hall
- Publication date: 1953
- Publication place: United Kingdom
- Media type: Print (Hardback & Paperback)

Love Among the Ruins: A Romance of the Near Future is a 1953 novel by Evelyn Waugh. It is a satire set in a dystopian, quasi-egalitarian Britain.

== Plot ==
The protagonist, Miles Plastic, is an orphan who, at the beginning of the story, is finishing a prison term for arson. Crime is treated very leniently by the state, and conditions in prison are actually quite superior to those among the population at large, leading to an understandably high recidivism rate. Upon release, Plastic goes to work at a state-run euthanasia centre. The centres are not restricted to the terminally ill and are so popular that Plastic's sole responsibility is to stem "the too eager rush" of perfectly healthy but "welfare weary" citizens.

Plastic soon falls in love with Clara, a bearded woman who is a "priority case" at the centre. However, she does not wish to die (she was sent there by her department) and the two begin a romance. One day, however, she suddenly disappears, and when he finds her, she has a rubber jaw replacing her formerly bearded face. Distraught, Plastic sets his former prison on fire, and, unidentified as the perpetrator of the crime, becomes elevated in status as the prison's only "successfully rehabilitated inmate." Sent to become a lecturer on the worthiness of the prison system, Plastic is directed to marry an unattractive civil servant. A curtain is drawn on the final conclusion as Plastic reaches into his pocket for his cigarette lighter.

== Publication ==
The story was also published in full in the British magazine Lilliput in the issue of May-June 1953 with illustrations by Mervyn Peake, and in the USA on 31 July 1953 in the Catholic magazine The Commonweal, which used some of the illustrations by Waugh that appear in the book published by Chapman & Hall.
