= A Blot in the 'Scutcheon =

1843 play by Robert Browning

- Written by: Robert Browning
- Original language: English
- Genre: Tragedy

Premiere
- Date premiered: 1843
- Place premiered: Drury Lane

A Blot in the 'Scutcheon is a tragedy in blank verse by Robert Browning, published in 1843 and acted in the same year.

== Characters ==
- Mildred Tresham
- Thorold, Earl Tresham
- Henry, Earl Mertoun
- Guendolen Tresham
- Austin Tresham
- Gerard, and other retainers of Lord Tresham

Time, 17—

== Synopsis ==
Mildred Tresham, only sister of Thorold, Earl Tresham, has been seduced by Henry, Earl Mertoun, whose lands adjoin those of her brother. Anxious to repair this wrong he formally requests her in marriage. Thorold, who knows nothing of his sister's fall, readily consents. But a retainer sees Mertoun climb to Mildred's chamber and informs his master, without being able to identify the intruder. Questioned by her brother, Mildred admits the truth of the story, but refuses to divulge her lover's name or to dismiss Earl Mertoun. Deeply wounded in his family pride, which is morbidly intense, Thorold is too emotionally stirred to infer that Mertoun and the lover are the same. Denouncing Mildred as a shameless woman he rushes into the park, where he wanders until midnight.

Meanwhile, Mildred's cousin, Gwendolen, in a talk with Mildred, has divined the identity of Mertoun and the offender, and with her fiancé and the earl’s brother, Austin Tresham, goes out to find Thorold and to persuade him to forgiveness. They are too late, however. At midnight Thorold encounters Mertoun on his way to an interview with Mildred, and in his anger compelled him to fight a duel in which Mertoun, refusing to defend himself, is mortally wounded. Realizing at length his own harshness and injustice towards a boy who was penitent and eager to atone for his fault, Thorold exchanges forgiveness with Mertoun, and on his death, takes poison. He then goes to beg forgiveness of his sister who grants it and dies of a broken heart, closely followed by her brother. In dying he says that he leaves to Austin and Gwendolen an unblotted 'scutcheon.

== Background ==
Browning's dramatic period extended from 1835 to the time of his marriage in 1846, and produced some nine plays, not all of which, however, were intended for the stage. Paracelsus, the first of the series, has been described as a "conversational drama", and Pippa Passes, though it has been staged, is essentially a poem to read. The historical tragedy of Strafford has been performed, but King Victor and King Charles, The Return of the Druses, Colombe's Birthday, A Soul's Tragedy, and Luria, while interesting in many ways, have not been regarded as successful stage-plays.

== Performance ==
A Blot in the 'Scutcheon was published in 1843 as the fifth number (No. V) of Bells and Pomegranates.

In a letter to John Forster, dated 25 November 1842, Charles Dickens wrote enthusiastically of Browning's play: "[It] has thrown me into a perfect passion of sorrow ... I know nothing that is so affecting, nothing in any book I have ever read, as Mildred's recurrence to that "I was so young—I had no mother."'

The play was performed at Drury Lane in 1843, but its chances of a successful run were spoiled by the jealousy of William Macready, the manager, and it ran for only three nights. It was presented again, under the management of Samuel Phelps, in 1848.

== Reception ==
The catastrophe has been criticised as not inevitable and the speeches as too analytical for the stage, but the pathos and tragic power of this drama have also received praise.

== Sources ==
- Birch, Dinah, ed. (2009). "Blot in the 'Scutcheon, A". In The Oxford Companion to English Literature. 7th ed. Oxford University Press.
- Clarke, George Herbert (1920). "Browning's "A Blot in the 'Scutcheon": A Defence". The Sewanee Review, 28(2): pp. 213–227.
- Eliot, Charles William, ed. (1909). "A Blot in the Scutcheon". Modern English Drama. The Harvard Classics. Vol. 18. New York: P. F. Collier & Son Corporation. pp. 358–404.
- Keller, Helen Rex (1924). "Blot in the 'Scutcheon, A". The Reader's Digest of Books. New York: The Macmillan Co. p. 95.
- Reese, Gertrude (1948). "Robert Browning and A Blot in the 'Scutcheon". Modern Language Notes, 63(4): pp. 237–240.
- Roberts, Adam (2011). "Browning, Robert, English poet and dramatist (1812–89)". In Schlicke, Paul (ed.). The Oxford Reader's Companion to Dickens. Oxford University Press
- Vann, J. Don (1979). "A Blot in the 'Scutcheon: A Literary Notice". Studies in Browning and His Circle, 7(2): pp. 68–70.

=== Reviews ===
- "A Blot in the 'Scutcheon". The Pall Mall Gazette. 1 February 1891. p. 1.
- ""The Blot in the 'Scutcheon"". The Globe. 16 June 1893. p. 3.
