= Alma Murray =

As Beatrice in The Cenci, 1898

Alma Murray (21 November 1854 – 3 July 1945) was an English actress, familiar in classic plays and contemporary drama, in the late 19th and early 20th centuries.

== Life and career ==
=== Early years ===
Alma Murray was born in London into a theatrical family, the daughter of the actor Leigh Murray and his wife, the actress Sarah Mannering.

Murray's first appearance was at the Olympic Theatre in January 1870 as Sacharissa in W. S. Gilbert's The Princess. In 1876, after a series of provincial engagements, she married the poet Alfred William Forman, the first translator of Wagner's Der Ring des Nibelungen. They had one child, Elsa. Murray played at the Lyceum Theatre with Henry Irving in 1879 and at different West End theatres from 1882 to 1897, and took a prominent part in the few attempts to produce the dramas of Shelley and Browning, playing Beatrice in The Cenci (1886) and Mildred in A Blot in the 'Scutcheon (1888). After her performance in The Cenci, Browning wrote her a letter of praise, describing her as "the poetic actress without a rival".

As Rosalind in As You Like It, 1897

Equally at home in modern or classic drama, Murray appeared as Julia in The Rivals, Grace Harkaway in London Assurance, Juliet in Romeo and Juliet, Titania in A Midsummer Night's Dream and Rosalind in As You Like It. In 1884, at the Comedy Theatre, London, she played in The New Woman, with Fred Terry and Cyril Maude. In 1885 she appeared in A Leader of Men with Marion Terry and H. B. Irving. She played Helena in John Todhunter's Helena in Troas (1886) and in 1890 appeared in A Modern Marriage, opposite Ellaline Terriss and Lewis Waller.

=== Shaw and later ===
Her enhanced reputation after playing Beatrice in The Cenci, led Bernard Shaw to invite Murray in 1894 to play Raina in the first production of his Arms and the Man which ran for fifty performances at the Avenue Theatre in London. Fifty years later he maintained that although many actresses had subsequently appeared as Raina none of them had surpassed Murray, for whom he wrote it, nor possessed "her unique combination of perfect stage technique with unspoilt freshness and charm".

She played Mrs Maylie in Oliver Twist (1905), the Queen in Pelléas and Mélisande (1911), Lady Dedmond in Galsworthy's Fugitive (1913), and Mrs Eynsford-Hill in Shaw's Pygmalion (1914). A collection of letters between Murray and Shaw was privately published in Edinburgh in 1927.

From 1915 onwards Murray appeared less and less frequently, and soon after the First World War she retired from the stage altogether. She outlived her husband by twenty years and died in London on 3 July 1945 at the age of ninety.

=== Sources ===
- Parker, John, ed. (1922). Who's Who in the Theatre (fourth ed.). London: Sir Isaac Pitman and Sons. OCLC 10013276.
