= Prince Hohenstiel-Schwangau, Saviour of Society =

"Prince Hohenstiel-Schwangau, Saviour of Society" is a long poem by Robert Browning, first published in 1871.

== Overview ==
The poem, which takes the French Emperor Napoleon III as its subject, was largely written in Florence in the early 1860s before apparently being abandoned. It appears that the poem was largely forgotten while Browning worked on Dramatis Personae and The Ring and the Book, which raised his profile and commercial appeal. In 1871, following the Franco-Prussian War and the forced end of Napoleon's reign, Browning dusted off his lengthy poem and made some revisions and additions before publishing it as Prince Hohenstiel-Schwangau in December 1871.

Sales were initially very strong, with more than one and a half thousand copies being sold in the first week, but they soon tailed off sharply; the poem's length and complexity apparently put off prospective readers, and the first printing run failed to sell out. No second edition was ever required. Some critics have called this poem the least-read of all Browning's works, though unlike Sordello 31 years earlier, the poem's reception had no discernible damaging effect on his continued popularity and strong critical reputation.
