= Paracelsus (disambiguation) =

Paracelsus (c. 1493–1531) was a Swiss physician, alchemist, lay theologian, and philosopher of the German Renaissance.

Paracelsus may also refer to:

- Paracelsus (poem), a poem by Robert Browning
- Paracelsus (film), a 1943 German drama film
- Paracelsus (crater), an impact crater on the Moon's far side
- Paracelsus Medical University, a private university located in Salzburg municipality, Austria and Nuremberg, Germany
- Paracelsus-Bad (Berlin U-Bahn), a Berlin U-Bahn station.
- Ellen Dahl (1886–1959), Danish writer that used the pen name 'Paracelsus'
