= Dramatis Personæ (poetry collection) =

Poetry collection by Robert Browning

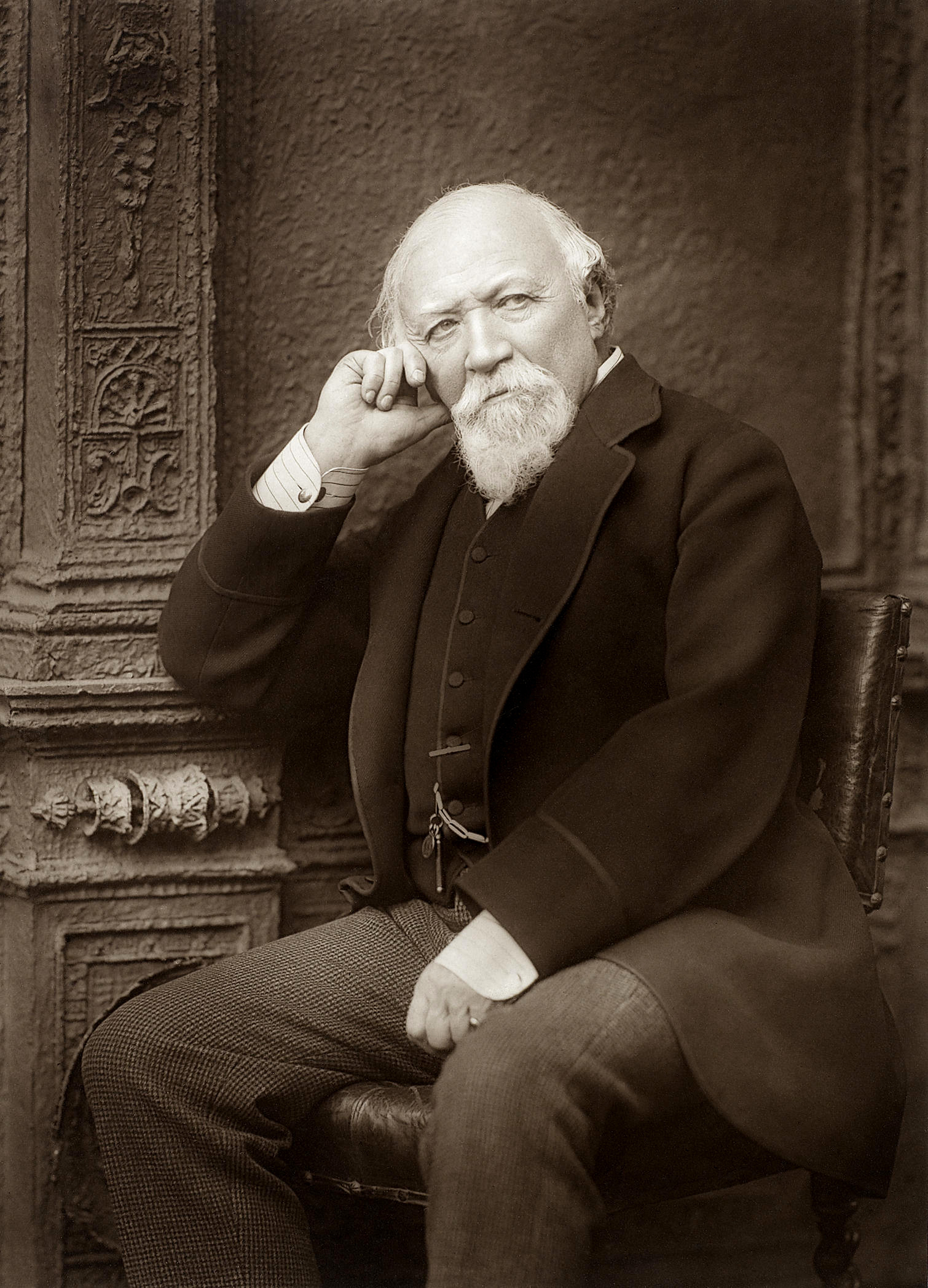
The author of the collection, Robert Browning

Dramatis Personæ is a poetry collection by Robert Browning. It was published in 1864.

== Background ==
Browning wrote the collection in London, where he had returned with his son after the death of his wife, Elizabeth Barrett Browning. It was his first publication after a nine-year hiatus. During this time, Browning's reputation was fluctuating, and Dramatis Personae along with The Ring and the Book, which is widely considered his greatest work, were enough to begin a critical re-evaluation of the writer.

== The poems ==
The poems in Dramatis Personae are dramatic, with a wide range of narrators. The narrator is usually in a situation that reveals to the reader some aspect of his personality. Instead of speeches that are intended for others' ears, most are soliloquies. They are generally darker than the poems found in Men and Women, his previous collection, and along with The Ring and the Book these poems embody a turning point in Browning's style. Browning's poetry after this point most notably touches on religion and marital distress, two potent issues of his time period.

This new style was appreciated, as Dramatis Personae sold enough copies for a second edition to be published, which was a first in Browning's career. However, though he gained respect, Browning didn't have much commercial success as a poet. The sales of this work and most notably his Collected Poems were helped by public sympathy after the death of his wife.

== Poems in the collection ==
1st edition

- James Lee
- Gold Hair: A Story of Pornic
- The Worst of It
- Dîs Aliter Visum; or, Le Byron de Nos Jours
- Too Late
- Abt Vogler
- Rabbi ben Ezra
- A Death in the Desert
- Caliban upon Setebos; or, Natural Theology in the Island
- Confessions
- May and Death
- Prospice
- Youth and Art
- A Face
- A Likeness
- Mr. Sludge, "The Medium"
- Apparent Failure
- Epilogue

Other editions

- Deaf and Dumb
- Eurydice to Orpheus
