= Hervé Riel =

Breton hero

- Herve Riel
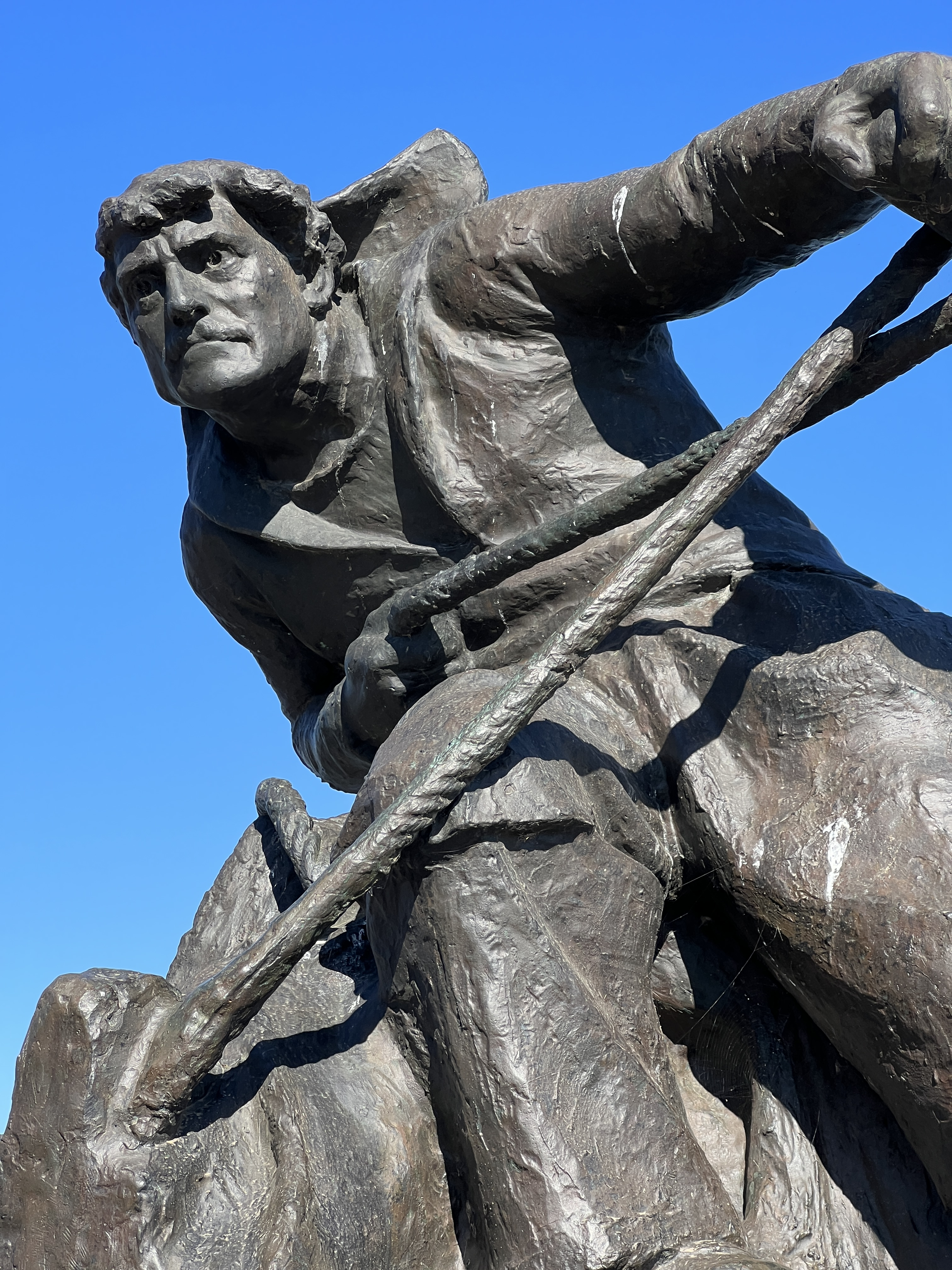
- A monument dedicated to Riel in Le Croisic
- Born: 17th century Brittany, Kingdom of France
- Monuments: Le Croisic
- Occupation: Fisherman

Hervé Riel (Breton: Herve Riel) was a French fisherman of the 17th century, from Le Croisic in Brittany. His claim to fame is that while serving with the French Navy he was instrumental in saving the French fleet following the battle of Barfleur in 1692. He is the subject of a heroic poem by Robert Browning, but little else is known of him or his life.

== The incident ==
Following the battle of Barfleur, on 29 May (NS) 1692, the French fleet under Tourville was retreating westward in order to regain a safe harbour, pursued by the Dutch and English fleets under Russell.

On 31 May the fleet was scattered over a wide area around the tip of the Cotentin Peninsula. Twenty-one ships, under Pannetier, were anchored west of Cap de la Hague, while the remainder, under Tourville, were to the east. Pannetier's squadron was between the cape and Alderney, at the head of the notorious Alderney Race (Fr. Raz Blanchard) and was shadowed by the Dutch White squadron, under Almonde, and the English Blue, under Ashby. Tourville was opposed by the Red, under Russell. As the tide started to flood and the wind rose, Tourville's squadron was swept east, pursued by Russell. Pannetier, wishing to escape, thought to sail through the Race, but his navigators demurred, fearing the passage of this turbulent channel, with its dangerous lee shore and rocky bottom offering little purchase if they needed to anchor. At this point Riel, who as a local fisherman was familiar with the passage, offered to guide the fleet through. Pannetier agreed, and with Riel's guidance piloted the flagship (Grand, 80 guns) through the Race, followed by the rest of the squadron. Neither Almonde nor Ashby were willing to follow; Almonde took his squadron westward around Alderney, but by the change of the tide Pannetier had too great a lead, and the chase was abandoned. The fleet reached St Malo safely. When asked what reward he wished, Riel asked merely to visit his home nearby, to see his wife, “the belle Aurore”. The poem records, with some cynicism, “that he got, and nothing more”

== The poem ==
Browning’s poem makes some errors of fact (for example, it gives the French admiral as d’Amfreville, who was with Tourville at la Hogue, and the French flagship as the Formidable, which was not present at this battle); otherwise it presents a clear and fast-moving narrative. Browning wrote the poem in 1871, and intended the proceeds be used to support the people of France suffering during the Siege of Paris (1870–1871). It was first published in the Cornhill magazine in March 1871, but now forms part of his collection Pacchiarotto, published in 1876.
