= Rabbi ben Ezra =

Poem by Robert Browning

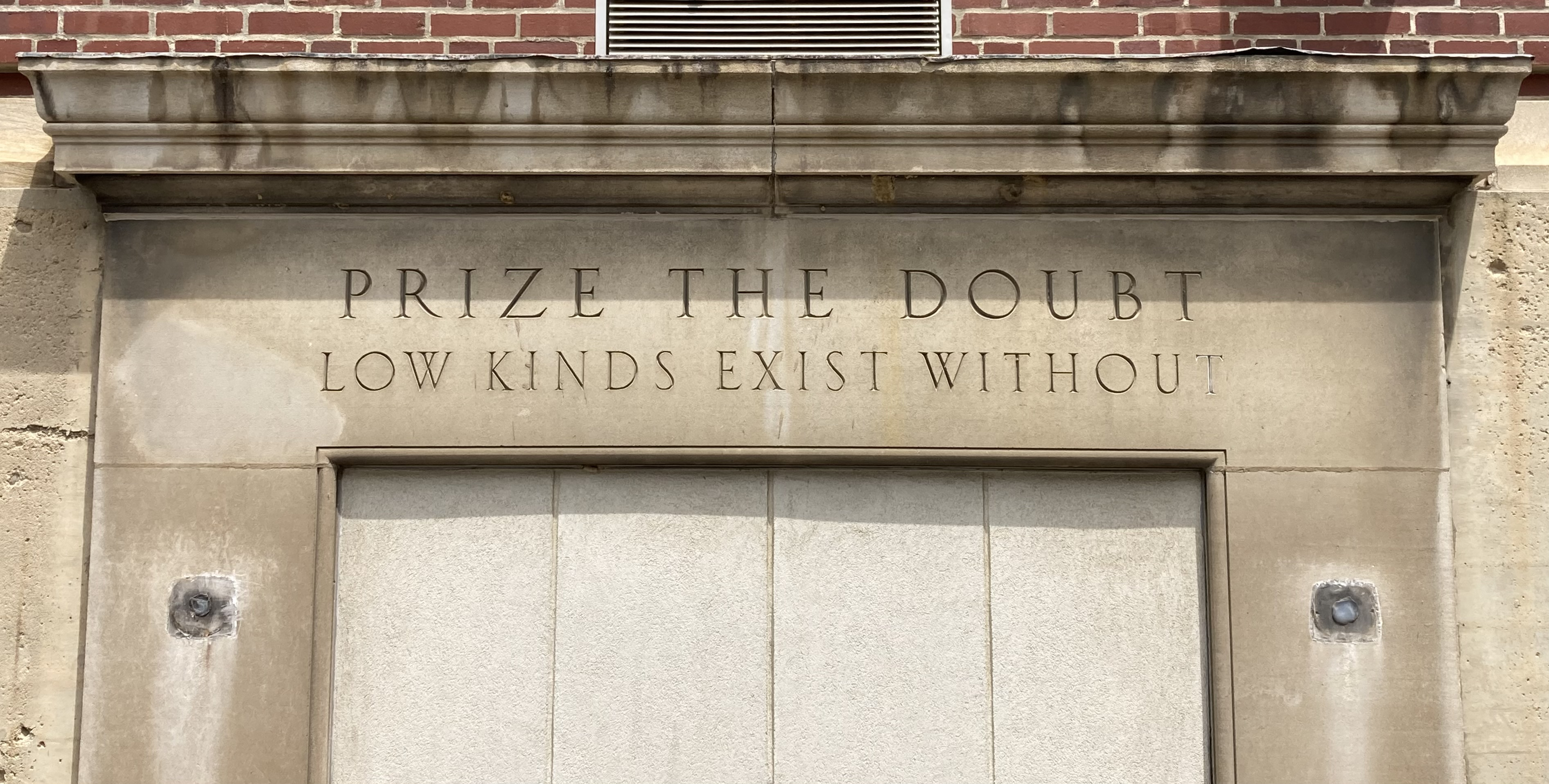
An inscription from lines 16 and 17 of the poem on a building at Ohio State University.

"Rabbi ben Ezra" is a poem by Robert Browning about Rabbi Abraham ibn Ezra (1092–1167), who is often considered one of the great Jewish poets and scholars of the 12th century. He wrote on grammar, astronomy, the astrolabe, and other topics.

== Analysis ==
The poem begins:

Grow old along with me!
The best is yet to be [...]

— Stanza I, lines 1-2

It is not a biography of Abraham ibn Ezra; like all of Browning's historical poems, it is a free interpretation of the idea that ibn Ezra's life and work suggests to Browning. At the center of the poem is a theistic paradox that good might lie in the inevitability of its absence:

For thence,—a paradox
Which comforts while it mocks,—
Shall life succeed in that it seems to fail:
What I aspired to be,
And was not, comforts me:
A brute I might have been, but would not sink i' the scale.

— Stanza VII

== History ==
The poem was published in Browning's Dramatis Personae in 1864.

== See also ==
- Pebble in the Sky, a science fiction novel by Isaac Asimov that mentions the poem
- "Grow Old with Me", a song by John Lennon, based in part on Browning's poem
