= Andrea del Sarto (poem) =

Poem by Robert Browning

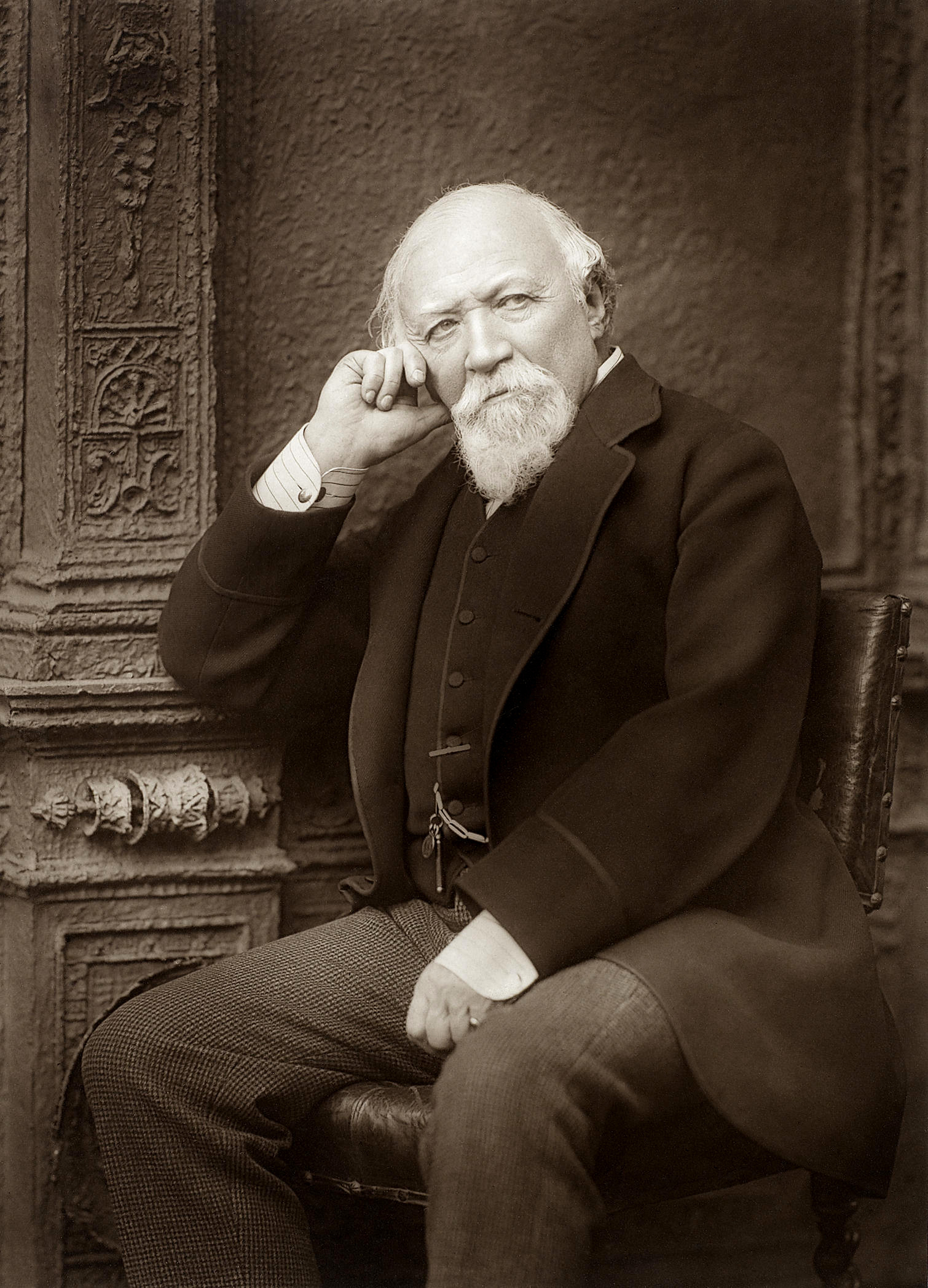
The poet, Robert Browning

"Andrea del Sarto" (also called "The Faultless Painter") is a poem by Robert Browning (1812–1889) published in his 1855 poetry collection, Men and Women. It is a dramatic monologue, a form of poetry for which he is famous, about the Italian painter Andrea del Sarto.

== Overview ==
"Andrea del Sarto" is one of Browning's dramatic monologues that shows that Browning is trying to create art that allows for the body and the soul to both be portrayed rather than just the body or just the soul. The poem is in blank verse and mainly uses iambic pentameter.

The poem was inspired by Andrea del Sarto, originally named Andrea d'Agnolo, a renaissance artist. The historical del Sarto was born in Florence, Italy on July 16, 1486, and died in Florence, Italy on September 29, 1530. Del Sarto was the pupil of Piero di Cosimo. del Sarto was influenced by Raphael, Leonardo da Vinci and Fra' Bartolommeo. He began to produce work in 1506. His work stems from traditional Quattrocento painting. Del Sarto was revered for his art; some called him Andrea senza errori, the unerring. In his poem, Browning cedes the paintings are free of errors, but that alone does not make a piece of art special or evocative. The poem is based on biographical material by Giorgio Vasari.

== Form ==
Two thirds of Browning's poetic works are written in unrhymed pentameters. Browning is considered one of the foremost innovators of the dramatic monologue, though he was little known by contemporary Victorians. Critics of his time commented on his lack of rhyme scheme, known as blank verse. Browning is also known for his originality, dramatic style and fresh subject matter for the time, which complemented his lack of rhyme scheme. Browning places his reader in the scene through his use of temporal adverbs. The first line is an example, where the narrator suggests "But do not let us quarrel any more." “Any more” (as used here) is a temporal adverb which also functions as a subordinate progressive. This literary tactic puts the reader inside the action by allowing them to look both forwards and backwards in the situation. Browning creates an internal world for his reader by giving them insight into how the narrator interprets the whole scene, not just the words spoken: line four, "You turn your face, but does it bring your heart?" refers to how the narrator is interpreting Lucrezia's body language. Some literary analysts claim Browning adapted his versification to his characters; Andrea del Sarto is no exception. It explores aestheticism and human reciprocity, and as a result is written in near perfect iambic pentameter.

== Analysis ==
During his life Browning struggled with religion. At age 13, he announced he was atheist, following in the foot steps of Percy Bysshe Shelley, the poet he looked up to. As Browning got older he was considered a Theist. Browning spent much of his work exploring and questioning religion through his dramatic monologues. Browning's main audience for all his poetry was his beloved wife Elizabeth Barrett Browning. Browning based del Sarto's love for his wife, Lucrezia, on his own love for his wife. Andrea del Sarto explores broad themes such as if all human interactions are governed by aesthetic or exchange value, failure, whether one's wife is a possession, and morality in general. Browning chose to use painters as his subjects during the Renaissance because art was much easier to access than writing, which was accessible only to those of wealth.

According to literary scholar Roma A. King the entire poem is "between asserted artistic and masculine virility and a steadily increasing awareness of debility." He backs this up by describing how he is trying to suggest his own masculine strength:

Your soft hand is a woman of itself,
And mine the man's bared breast she curls inside.

— Lines 21-22

However, later undertones hint at the faultless painter's insufficiency, as Lucrezia still chooses her lover over her husband, even though he is making her a romantic suit. He quickly falls into a class of literary males who lack masculinity, a prototype for Prufrock. King discusses del Sarto's lack of virility, as he describes his wife the way a painter would, with lines and shapes, as opposed to a husband or person of romantic interest:

But had you—oh, with the same perfect brow,
And perfect eyes, and more than perfect mouth,
And the low voice my soul hears, as a bird

— Lines 122-124

Instead of images of interest and arousal, he speaks of her as a figure to be painted.

This is much the same as in the rest of the work, according to Stefan Hawlin, another literary scholar. He believes that Browning is explaining, through this poem, that del Sarto is not as famous as many other artists because he “shies away from the vivid and necessarily sexual fullness of life, and the spirituality that is a part of that fullness.” Hawlin also explains that his wife's beauty is without a soul to del Sarto, it is only a beauty on the outside, which perfectly matches the state of del Sarto's art, which is beautiful, but spiritually empty.
