= Jocoseria =

Short poem collection

Jocoseria is a collection of short poems by Robert Browning, first published in 1883.

Effectively a continuation of the Dramatic Idyls series, the book was not well received by critics at the time and has continued to be considered one of the poet's least effective collections, aside from the famous prologue to the collection.

The prologue, which has no official title but is usually referred to by its first line, "Wanting is—what?", became one of Browning's favourite short lyrics and is a standard fixture in anthologies.

Jocoseria—whose title comes from a 1598 collection of jokes and anecdotes, referring to its jocose and serious contents—was released in late 1883, and enjoyed decent sales despite the lack of critical plaudits, to such an extent that Browning's already-completed follow-up Ferishtah's Fancies was delayed for nearly a year so as not to crowd it out of the shops.

== Contents ==
- Wanting is—what?
- Donald
- Solomon and Balkis
- Cristina and Monaldeschi
- Mary Wollstonecraft and Fuseli
- Adam, Lilith, and Eve
- Ixion
- Jochanan Hakkadosh
- Never the Time and the Place
- Pambo
