= Pacchiarotto, and How He Worked in Distemper =

Pacchiarotto, and How He Worked in Distemper is a short collection of English poems by Robert Browning, published in 1876. The collection marked Browning's first collection of short pieces for more than twelve years. It received a mixed reception. The title poem, which ostensibly discusses the life and works of 15th-century Italian painter Giacomo Pacchiarotti, is actually a thinly veiled attack on Browning's own critics, in particular Alfred Austin, and many other pieces in the collection take the same tone.

== Contents ==
- Prologue
- Of Pacchiarotto, and How He Worked in Distemper
- At the "Mermaid"
- House
- Shop
- Pisgah-Sights
- Fears and Scruples
- Natural Magic
- Magical Nature
- Bifurcation
- Numpholeptos
- Appearances
- St. Martin's Summer
- Hervé Riel
- A Forgiveness
- Cenciaja
- Filippo Baldinucci on the Privilege of Burial
- Epilogue

== Reception ==
William Lyon Phelps called the poem Pachiarotto "an error in judgment". Park Honan and Edward Irvine regarded it as indicating "a growing perversity not wholly attributable to old age, a new failure in self-control and more deeply in self-assurance."
