= Pauline: A Fragment of a Confession =

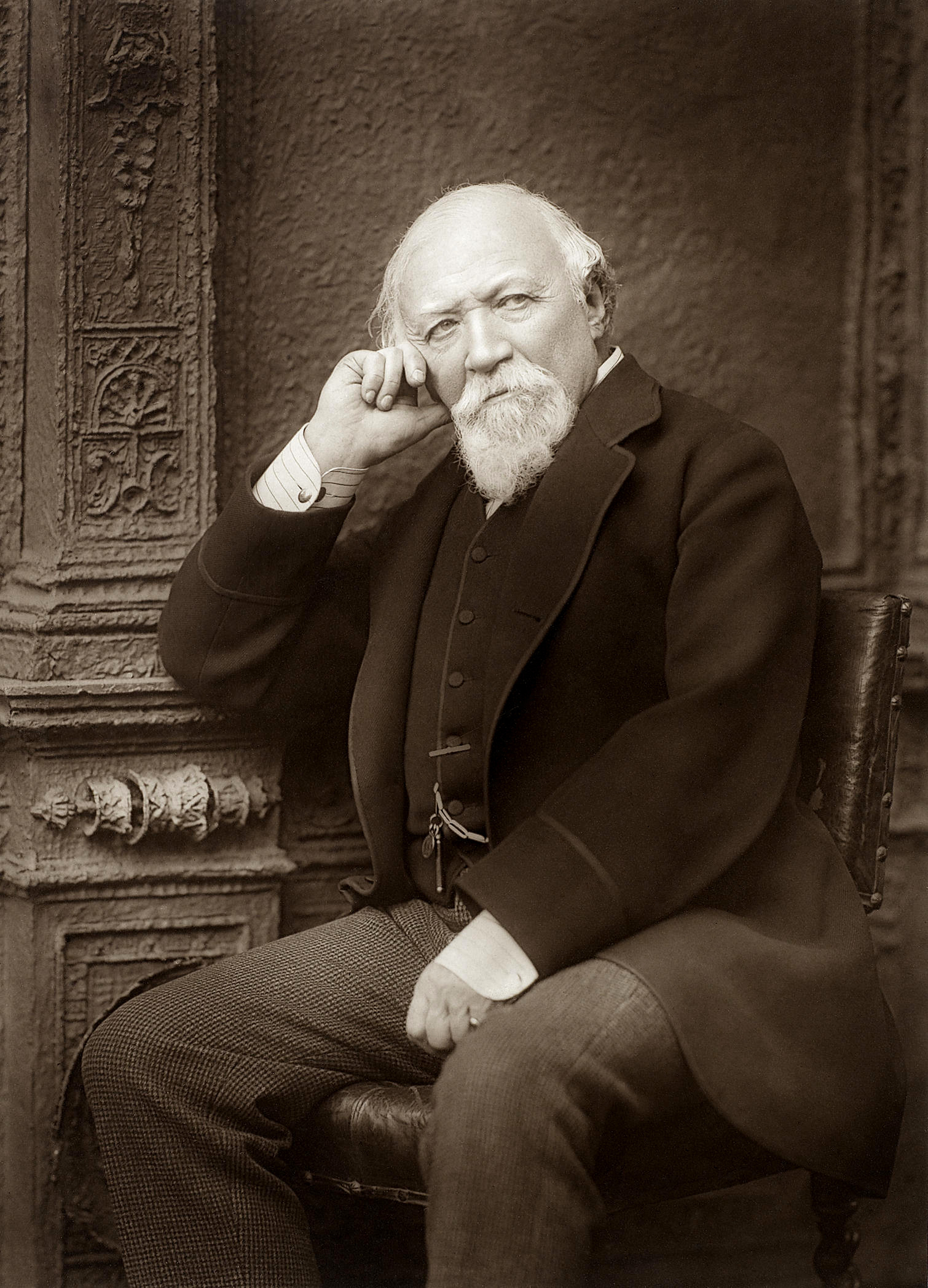
The poet, Robert Browning, in later years

Pauline: A Fragment of a Confession (also known as Pauline) is the first published poem by Robert Browning. It was written in 1832, and published anonymously in 1833. The poem is the confession of an unnamed poet to his lover, the eponymous woman. It was first reprinted in 1868 with no alterations to the text.

== Critical analysis ==
Arthur Symons described the poem as a "sort of spiritual biography" in the way that it describes the feelings and emotions of the poet, rather than the actions. Isobel Armstrong argued that the poem was Browning's attempt to "institutionalize" himself as a Romantic poet. Browning described himself within the poem as "priest and prophet" and therefore gave himself both the meaning and purpose that he was seeking as a young man.
