= How They Brought the Good News from Ghent to Aix =

1845 poem by Robert Browning

"How They Brought the Good News from Ghent to Aix" is a poem by Robert Browning published in Dramatic Romances and Lyrics, 1845. The poem, one of the volume's "dramatic romances", is a first-person narrative told, in breathless galloping meter, by one of three riders; the midnight errand is urgent—"the news which alone could save Aix from her fate"—although the nature of that good news is never revealed. Two of the riders' horses collapse en route; the narrator alone makes it to Aix with the news, and rewards his horse with a drink of wine.

In the words of William Rose Benet, it is "noted for its onomatopoetic effects". Browning himself remarked in a letter, "There is no historical incident whatever commemorated in the poem ... a merely general impression of the characteristic warfare and besieging which abound in the annals of Flanders". (Undaunted, an editor of Browning suggested the historical event of the Pacification of Ghent in 1576.)

== Analysis ==
The towns through which the riders pass are characterized only by the associated time of night, dawn, and day, also a feature of Henry Wadsworth Longfellow's later poem of urgent nightlong news-bearing, "Paul Revere's Ride". Although the incident is fictional, the sequence of towns (several of which are referred to by their French names) is rational:

- Ghent
- Lokeren
- Boom
- Düffeld
- Mecheln
- Aershot
- Hasselt
- Looz
- Tongres
- Dalhem
- Aix-la-Chapelle

== Legacy ==
W. C. Sellar and R. J. Yeatman parodied Browning's poem in their book Horse Nonsense as "How I Brought the Good News from Aix to Ghent (or Vice Versa)".

In 1889 Browning attempted to recite the poem into a phonograph at a public gathering, but forgot the words; this is the only known recording of Browning's voice.
