= Ferishtah's Fancies =

Ferishtah's Fancies is a book of poetry by Robert Browning first published in 1884. Technically the book is one long poem divided into twelve parts, but the parts are so disparate that many critics have considered it a collection of shorter pieces rather than a lengthy whole.

The book is narrated by Browning in the thinly disguised persona of the Persian soothsayer Ferishtah, who tells several parables (the titular "fancies") to students that illustrate his/Browning's opinions on a number of religious and moral topics. The Persian names and references are taken from Ferdowsi's Shāhnāmeh, but by and large the tales are Browning's invention. No connection was intended with the Persian historian Firishta.

Browning had finished the book by late January 1884, but his publisher chose to delay its release until the end of the year so as not to compromise the sales of his recently released collection Jocoseria. Reviews were mixed, some critics opining that there was "too much preaching and not enough poetry" in the book, but sales were good, due in part to the prevailing fashion for Orientalism in England at the time. The book is nowadays considered a very minor work in the Browning canon and selections from it are rarely included in Browning anthologies.

== Contents ==
- Prologue
1. The Eagle
2. Melon-Seller
3. Shah Abbas
4. The Family
5. The Sun
6. Mihrab Shah
7. A Camel-Driver
8. Two Camels
9. Cherries
10. Plot-Culture
11. A Pillar at Sebzevah
12. A Bean-stripe; also Apple-Eating
- Epilogue
