= The Return of the Druses =

Drama by Robert Browning

- Original language: English
- Written by: Robert Browning
- Genre: Tragedy

Premiere
- Date: 1843

The Return of the Druses is a tragedy in blank verse by Robert Browning. It was originally published as the fourth number (No. IV) of Bells and Pomegranates in 1843. The manuscript was first named Mansoor the Hierophant.

== Persons ==
- The Grand-Master's Prefect
- The Patriarch's Nuncio
- The Republic's Admiral
- Loys de Dreux, Knight-Novice
- Initiated Druses—Djabal, Khalil, Anael, Maani, Karshook, Raghib, Ayoob, and others
- Uninitiated Druses, Prefect's Guard, Nuncio's Attendants, Admiral's Force

Time, 14—

== See also ==
- Druze

== Sources ==
- Scudder, Horace E. (1895). The Complete Poetic and Dramatic Works of Robert Browning. Boston and New York: Houghton, Mifflin and Co.; Cambridge: The Riverside Press. p. 197.
