= Paracelsus (crater) =

Crater on the Moon

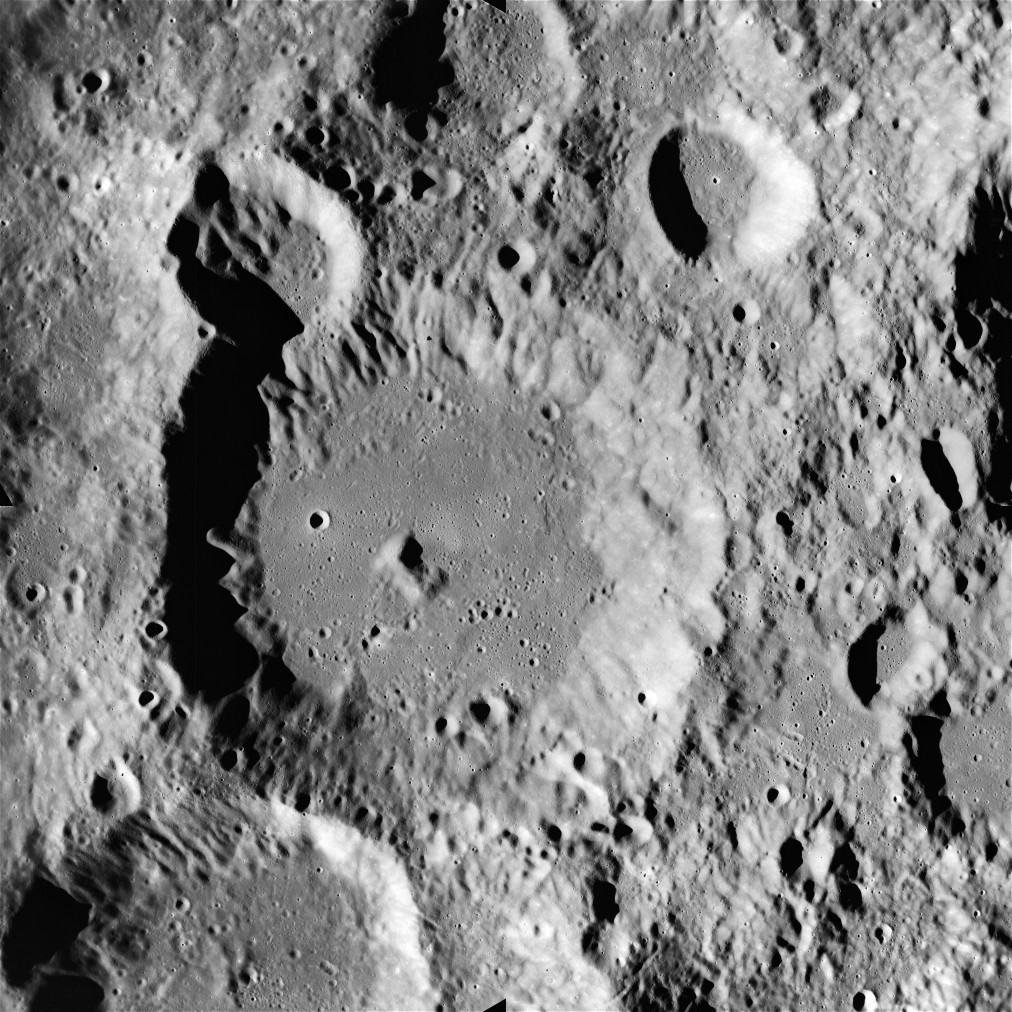
- Paracelsus from Apollo 15. NASA photo.
- Coordinates: 23.0°S 163.1°E
- Diameter: 83 km
- Depth: Unknown
- Colongitude: 198° at sunrise
- Formation: Imbrian
- Eponym: Paracelsus

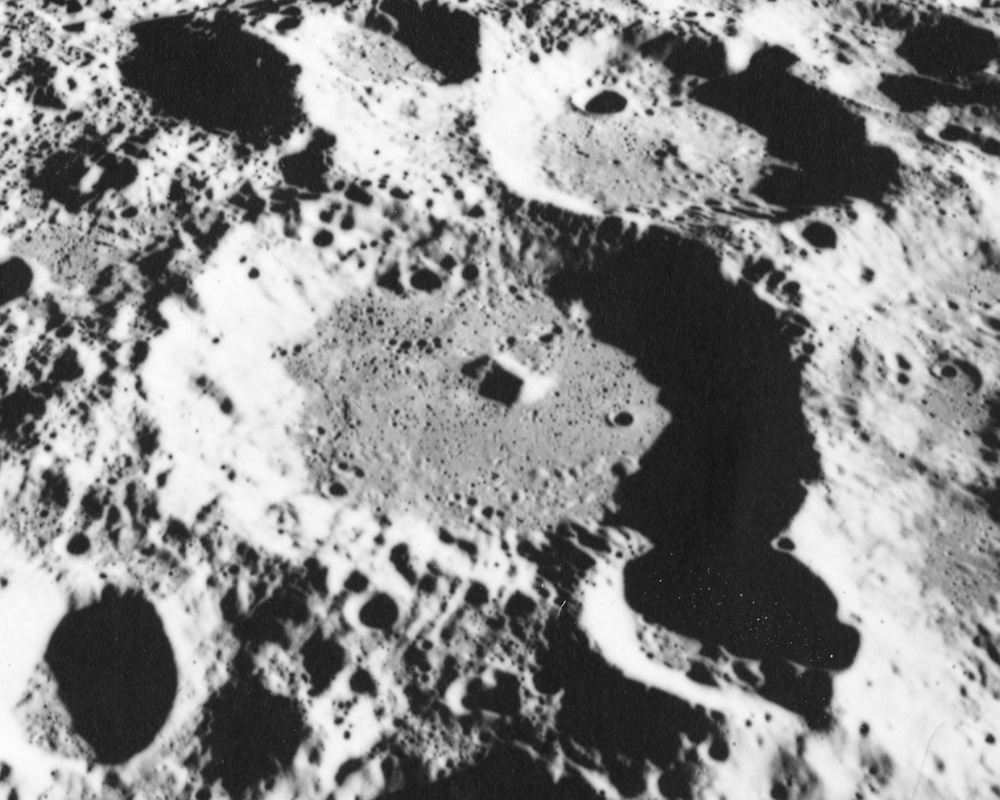
Oblique view facing south from Apollo 17

Paracelsus is an impact crater on the Moon's far side. It is located to the east of the crater Barbier, and to the southwest of a large walled plain called Vertregt. To the south is the Mare Ingenii, one of the few lunar maria on the far side.

This formation dates to the Imbrian period on the lunar geologic timescale. It is a circular crater with the smaller Paracelsus Y intruding into its northwestern rim. Attached to the southwest exterior is Paracelsus P. The rim of Paracelsus is eroded, although the edge is still moderately well-defined. There is little evident terrace structure along the inner wall, and in places the features are radial to the center. The interior floor is level, with a central peak offset slightly to the west of the midpoint. There are a few tiny craterlets in the southern half of the floor.

== Satellite craters ==
By convention these features are identified on lunar maps by placing the letter on the side of the crater midpoint that is closest to Paracelsus.

Paracelsus	Latitude	Longitude	Diameter
C	21.7° S	165.1° E	24 km
E	23.0° S	167.2° E	66 km
G	24.6° S	165.7° E	27 km
H	26.0° S	166.2° E	12 km
M	26.1° S	163.0° E	41 km
N	25.4° S	162.0° E	7 km
P	24.9° S	161.7° E	63 km
Y	21.5° S	162.7° E	26 km
