= A Soul's Tragedy =

1846 play by Robert Browning

- Written by: Robert Browning
- Original language: English
- Genre: Tragi-comedy

Premiere
- Date premiered: 1846

A Soul's Tragedy is a play by Robert Browning. It was first printed with Luria as the concluding number of Bells and Pomegranates (No. VIII) in April 1846. It is a tragi‐comedy in two acts: the first in verse, the second in prose.

== Persons ==
- Luitolfo and Eulalia, betrothed lovers
- Chiappino, their friend
- Ogniben, the Pope's Legate
- Citizens of Faenza

Time, 15—

== Sources ==
- Birch, Dinah, ed. (2009). "Soul's Tragedy, A". In The Oxford Companion to English Literature. 7th ed. Oxford University Press. Retrieved 20 October 2022.
- Drabble, M.; Stringer, J.; Hahn, D., eds. (2007). "Soul's Tragedy, A". In The Concise Oxford Companion to English Literature. 3rd ed. Oxford University Press. Retrieved 20 October 2022.
- Scudder, Horace E. (1895). The Complete Poetic and Dramatic Works of Robert Browning. Boston and New York: Houghton, Mifflin and Co.; Cambridge: The Riverside Press. p. 289.
