= The Ring and the Book =

1869 verse novel by Robert Browning

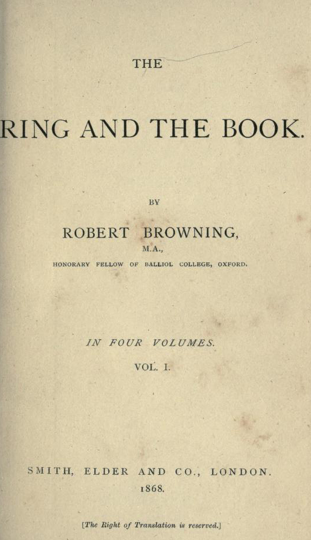
- Cover, circa 1868.
- Author: Robert Browning
- Language: English
- Genre: Narrative poem, historical fiction, true crime, mystery
- Set in: Papal States, 1698
- Publication date: 1868
- Publication place: Britain
- OCLC: 1050733752
- Dewey Decimal: 821.83
- LC Class: PR4219.A2 A4
- Text: The Ring and the Book at Wikisource
- Form: Blank verse
- Meter: Unrhymed iambic pentameter
- Lines: 21,000

The Ring and the Book is a long dramatic narrative poem, and, more specifically, a verse novel, of 21,000 lines, written by Robert Browning. It was published in four volumes from 1868 to 1869 by Smith, Elder & Co.

== Plot outline ==
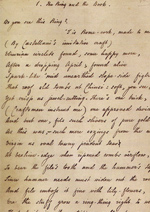
First page of the original manuscript

The book tells the story of a murder trial in Rome, Papal States in 1698, whereby an impoverished nobleman, Count Guido Franceschini, is found guilty of the murders of his young wife Pompilia (née Comparini) and her parents, having suspected his wife was having an affair with a young cleric, Giuseppe Caponsacchi. Having been found guilty despite his protests and sentenced to death, Guido then appeals—unsuccessfully—to Pope Innocent XII to overturn the conviction. The poem comprises twelve books, ten of which are dramatic monologues spoken by different characters involved in the case (Count Guido speaks twice), usually giving a different account of the same events, and two books (the first and the last) spoken by the author.

== Books making up the full poem ==
1. The Ring and the Book
2. Half-Rome
3. The Other Half-Rome
4. Tertium Quid
5. Count Guido Franceschini
6. Giuseppe Caponsacchi
7. Pompilia
8. Dominus Hyacinthus de Archangelis
9. Juris Doctor Johannes Baptista Bottinius
10. Pope Innocent XII
11. Guido
12. The Book and the Ring

== Major characters ==
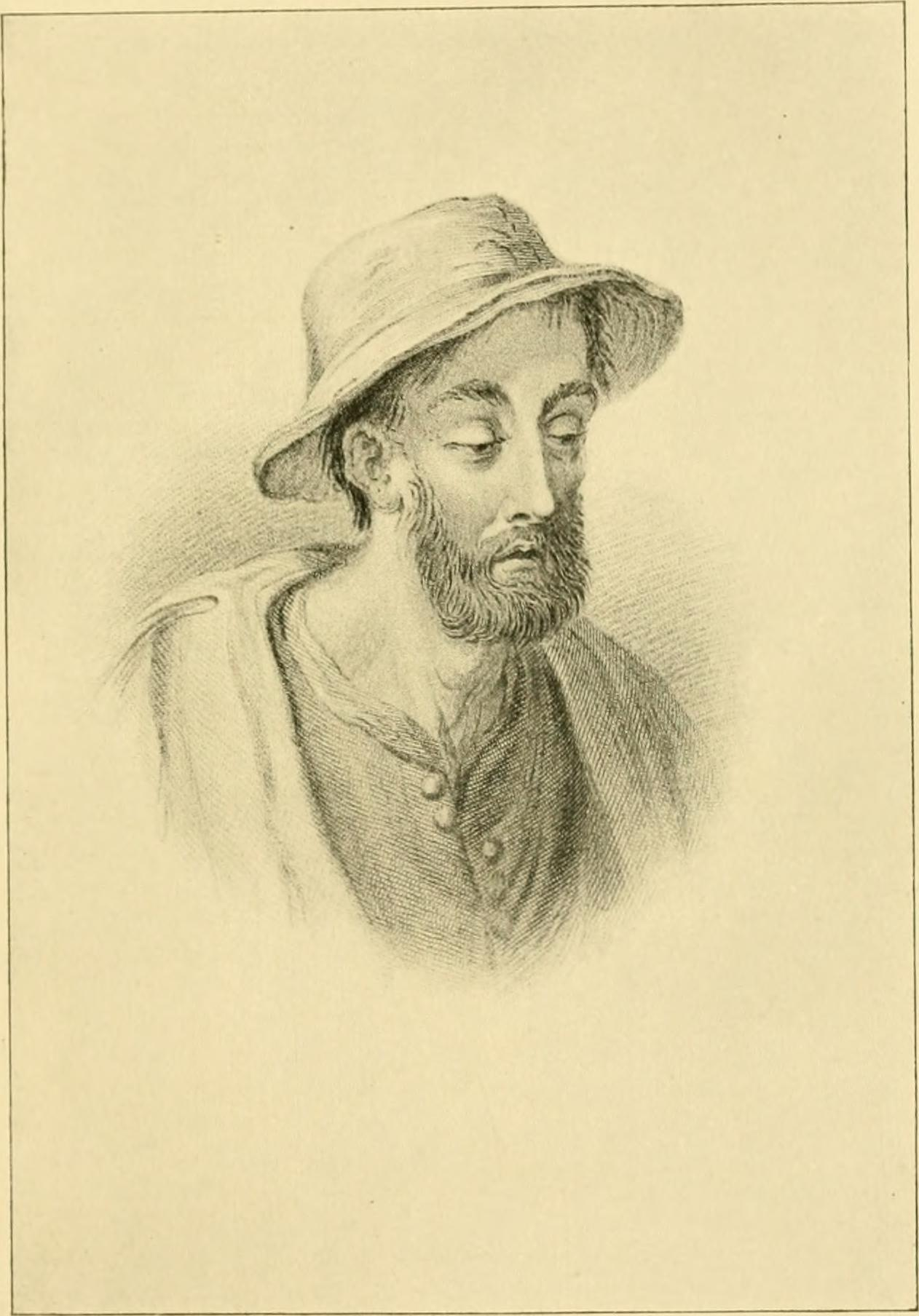
Portrait of Guido, from an 1897 edition

- Count Guido Franceschini
- Pompilia Comparini, his wife
- Pietro Comparini, supposed father of Pompilia
- Violante Comparini, supposed mother of Pompilia
- Giuseppe Caponsacchi, a priest
- Pope Innocent XII

== Conception and analysis ==
The poem is based on a real-life case. Under Roman law at the time, trials were not held in open court but rather by correspondence, whereupon each witness was required to submit a written statement for future adjudication. Browsing in a flea market in Florence in 1860, Browning came across a large volume of these written statements relating to the 1698 Franceschini case, and bought it on the spot. This volume – later known as the Yellow Book, after the colour of its aged covers – struck Browning as an excellent basis for a poem, but he was unable to get any further than the basic idea and often offered it as a subject to other writers, notably Alfred Tennyson, upon which to base a poem or novel. There were no takers, and following his wife's death and his return to England, Browning revived his old plan for a long poem based on the Roman murder case almost eight years after the idea had first struck him.

The first book features a narrator, possibly Browning himself, who relates the story of how he came across the Yellow Book in the market and then giving a broad outline of the plot. The next two books give the views and gossip of the Roman public, apparently divided over which side to support in the famous case, who give differing accounts of the circumstances surrounding the case and the events which took place. Book 4 is spoken by a lawyer, Tertium Quid, who has no connection to the case but gives what he claims is a balanced, unbiased view of proceedings. Book 5 contains the start of the testimony from the trial, allowing the accused murderer Franceschini to give his side of the story, Book 6 is told from the perspective of the young priest who was accused of being Pompilia's lover, and who asserts no adultery took place, that he simply tried to help Pompilia escape her abusive husband. Book 7 is the account of the dying Pompilia, mortally wounded but not killed in the attack.

Books 8 and 9 consist of depositions by the two opposing trial lawyers, and are filled with legal bickering and discussion of minute pieces of evidence that may or may not be related to the case as a whole; these could be interpreted as representing Browning's somewhat humorous attacks on the convoluted English and European legal systems. Book 10 is perhaps the best-known of the monologues in the poem, as Pope Innocent XII considers Franceschini's appeal against a wider backdrop of moral and theological questions, including well-wrought reflections on the nature of good and evil. However, the Pope ultimately rejects Franceschini's plea. Book 11 is similarly well-regarded and features Franceschini in his cell the night before his execution, wherein he begs for his life and seems, at times, to lose his mind. Book 12 returns to the initial narrator's voice, which chronicles the conclusion and implications of the trial, as well as the poem.

== Reception and reputation ==
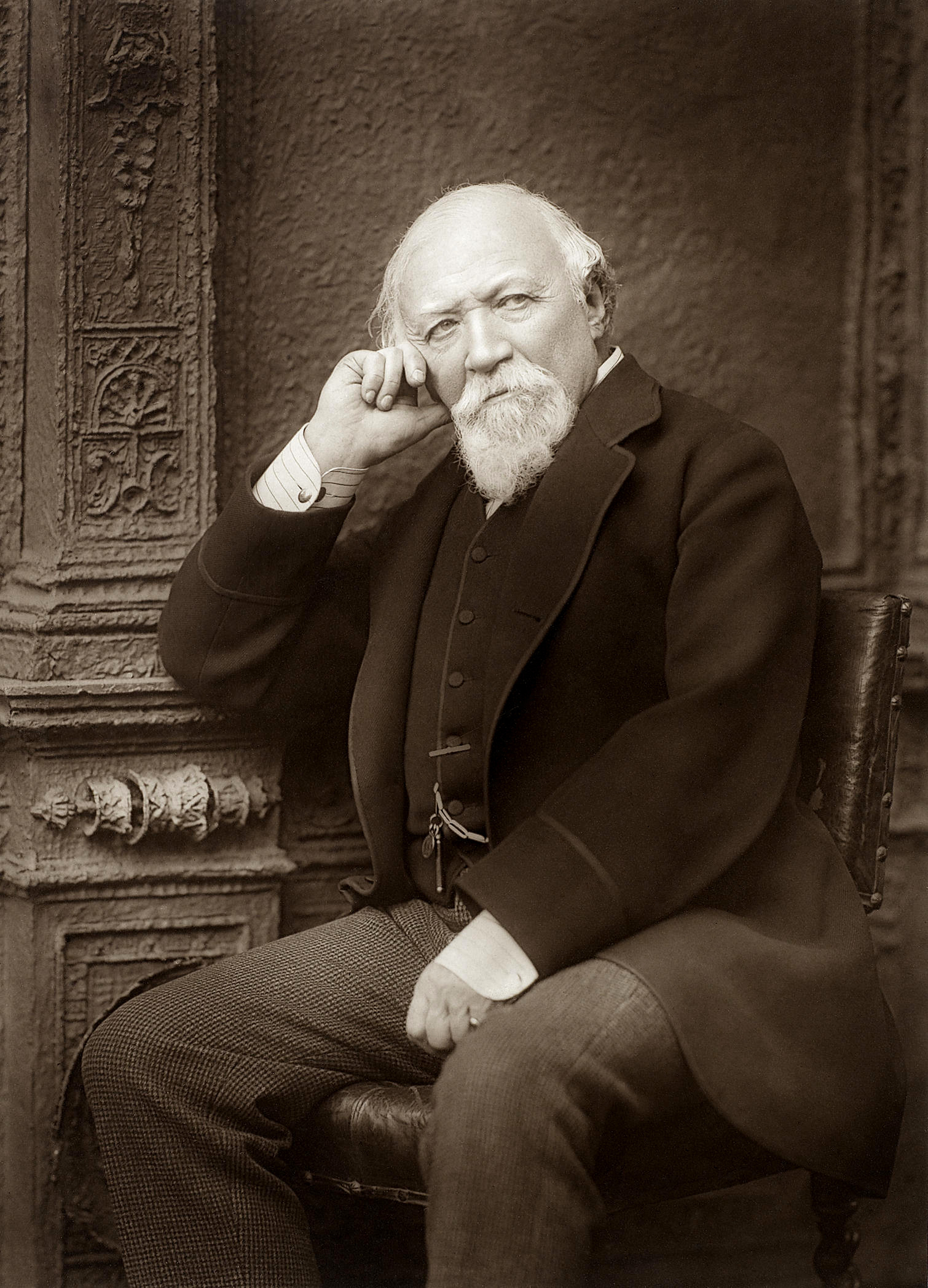
Robert Browning

The Ring and the Book was, by some margin, the best-selling of all Browning's works during his lifetime. The depth of its philosophical, psychological, and spiritual insight is a step up from anything Browning produced before or after, and the poem was almost universally hailed as a work of genius, restoring the pioneering reputation among the first rank of English poets which Browning had lost with Sordello nearly thirty years previously. The book lost popularity with readers during the 20th century. After its printing by Scribner's in the early twentieth-century, The Ring and the Book was printed by W. W. Norton & Company in the 1960s and 1970s. It is now currently available, though still difficult to acquire affordably or in a non-scholarly reading edition, by Broadview Press.

An illustrated guide of the region in which the story is set was published in 1913, entitled The Country of The Ring and the Book and written by Sir Frederick Treves, 1st Baronet.

Facsimile, translated, and free digital copies of the Old Yellow Book (the source documents for the poem) are also available, and they reveal the extent of conjecture and invention Browning used when writing the poem. After Browning's death, a cache of documents relating to the case almost twice the size of the Yellow Book was found in an Italian library in the 1920s.

Browning's son Pen donated the Old Yellow Book and a ring of Browning's to Balliol College, Oxford University. The ring was mistakenly thought to be the one described in the poem.

== Adaptations ==
The movie Rashomon (1950) by Kurosawa is based on two books by Ryūnosuke Akutagawa, Rashomon (1915), and Yabu no naka (1921). Akutagawa was Browning's first Japanese translator. As Jorge Luis Borges explains in one of his lectures, the main plot device of Rashomon is directly taken from The Ring and the Book.

The story is re-told in Derek Parker's 2001 true crime book Roman Murder Mystery: The True Story of Pompilia.

In July 2008, a two-part play adaptation of this story, set in poetry and prose by Martyn Wade and starring Anton Lesser as Browning, Roger Allam as Guido Franceschini and Louise Brealey as Pompilia, was broadcast as the BBC Radio 4 "Classic Serial". Abigail le Fleming produced and directed.

== Gallery ==
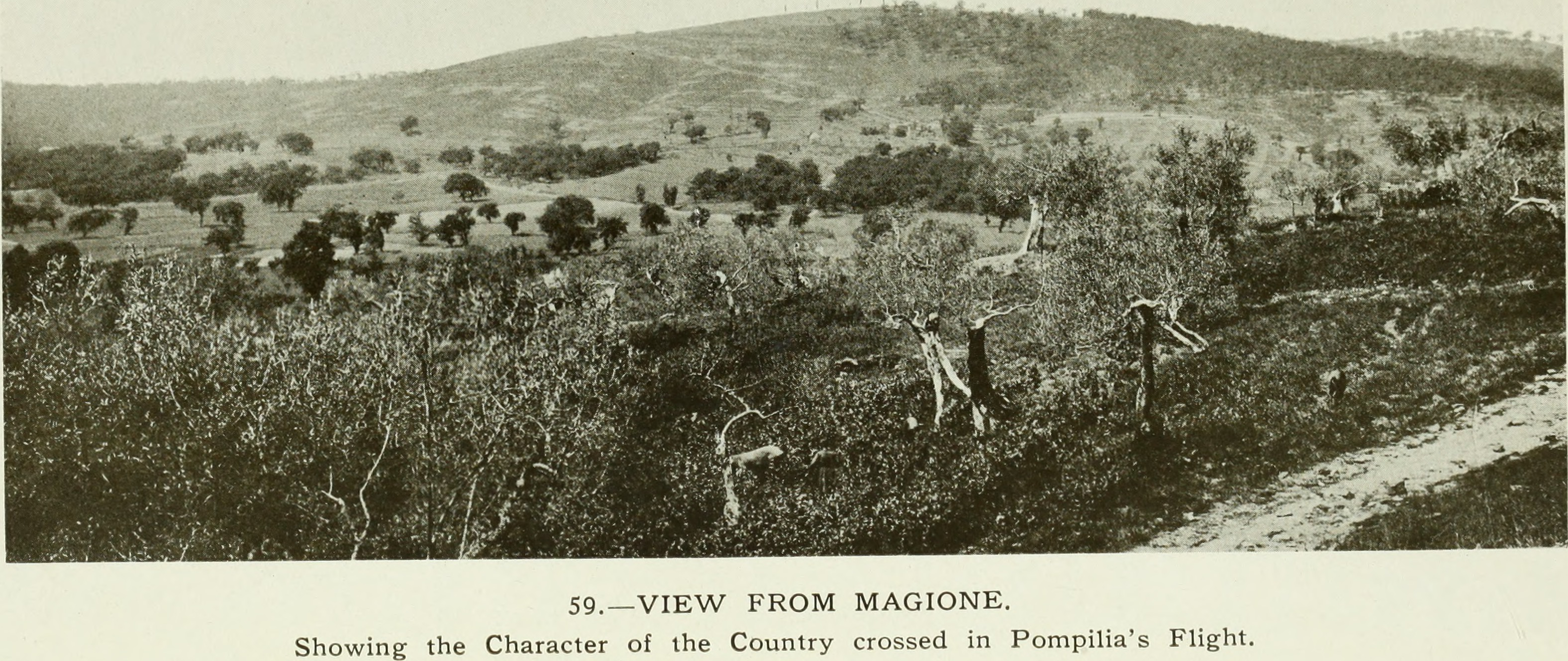
Countryside crossed by Pompilia

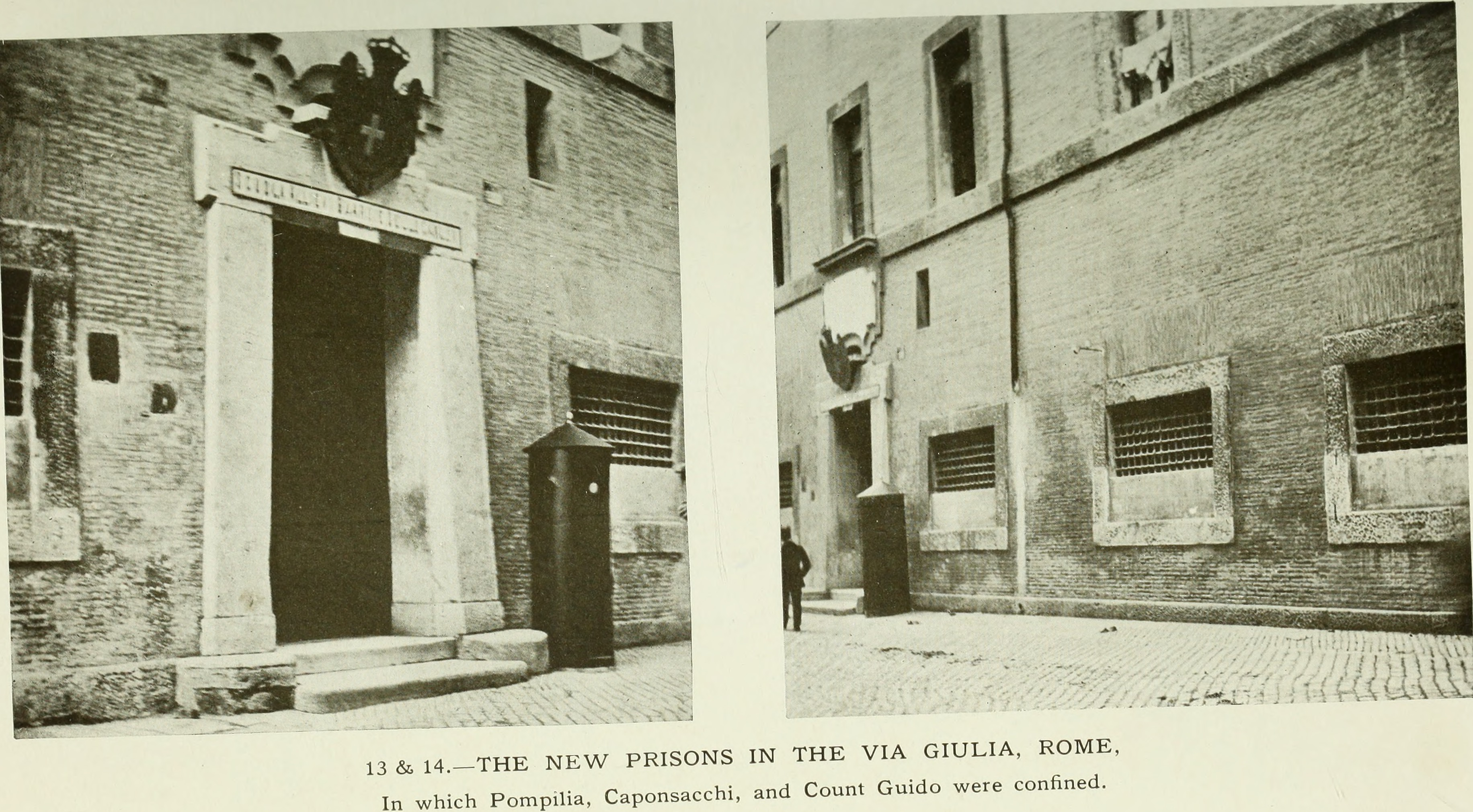
Photograph of the prison where the three main figures were imprisoned

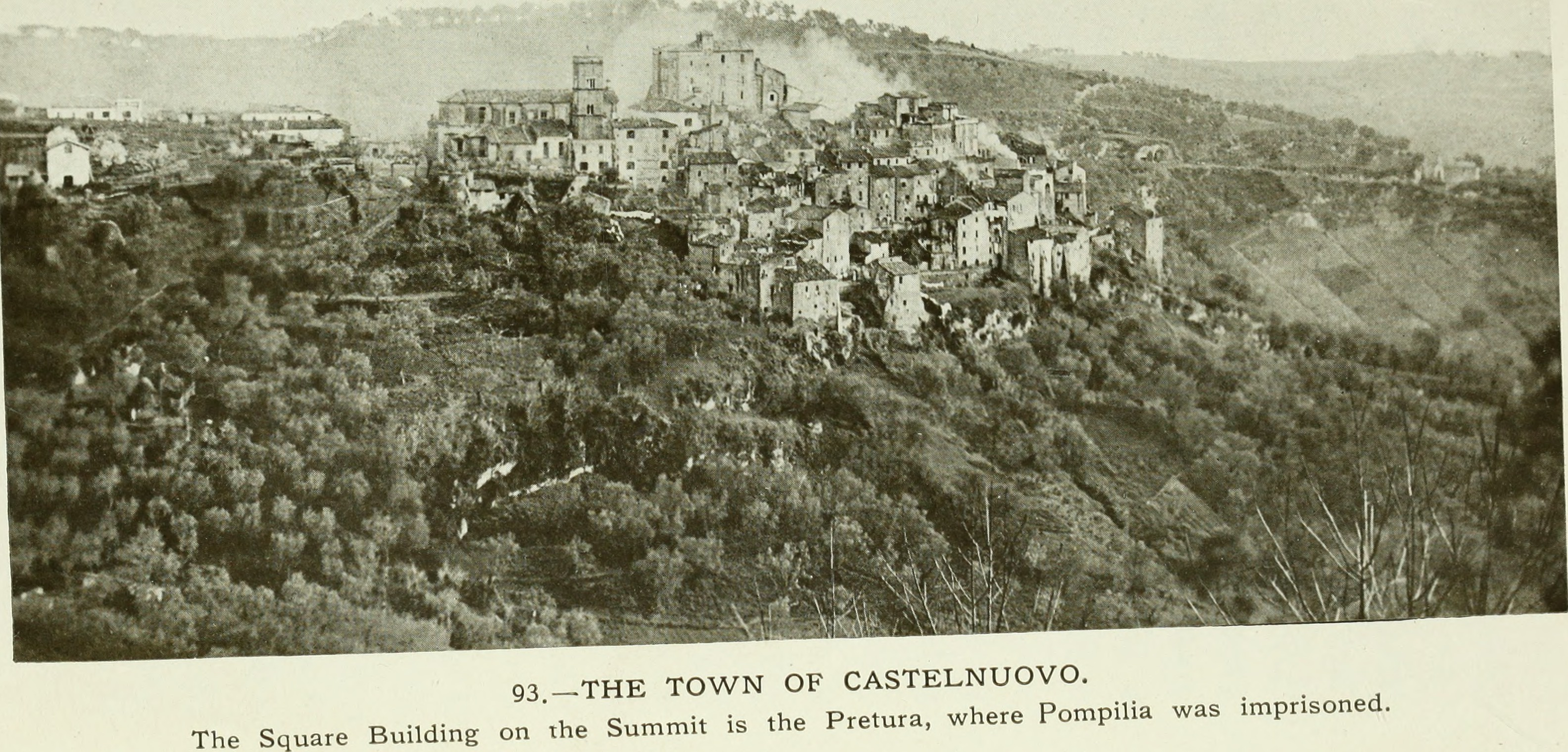
Castelnuovo di Porto with its Pretura (magistrate's court).

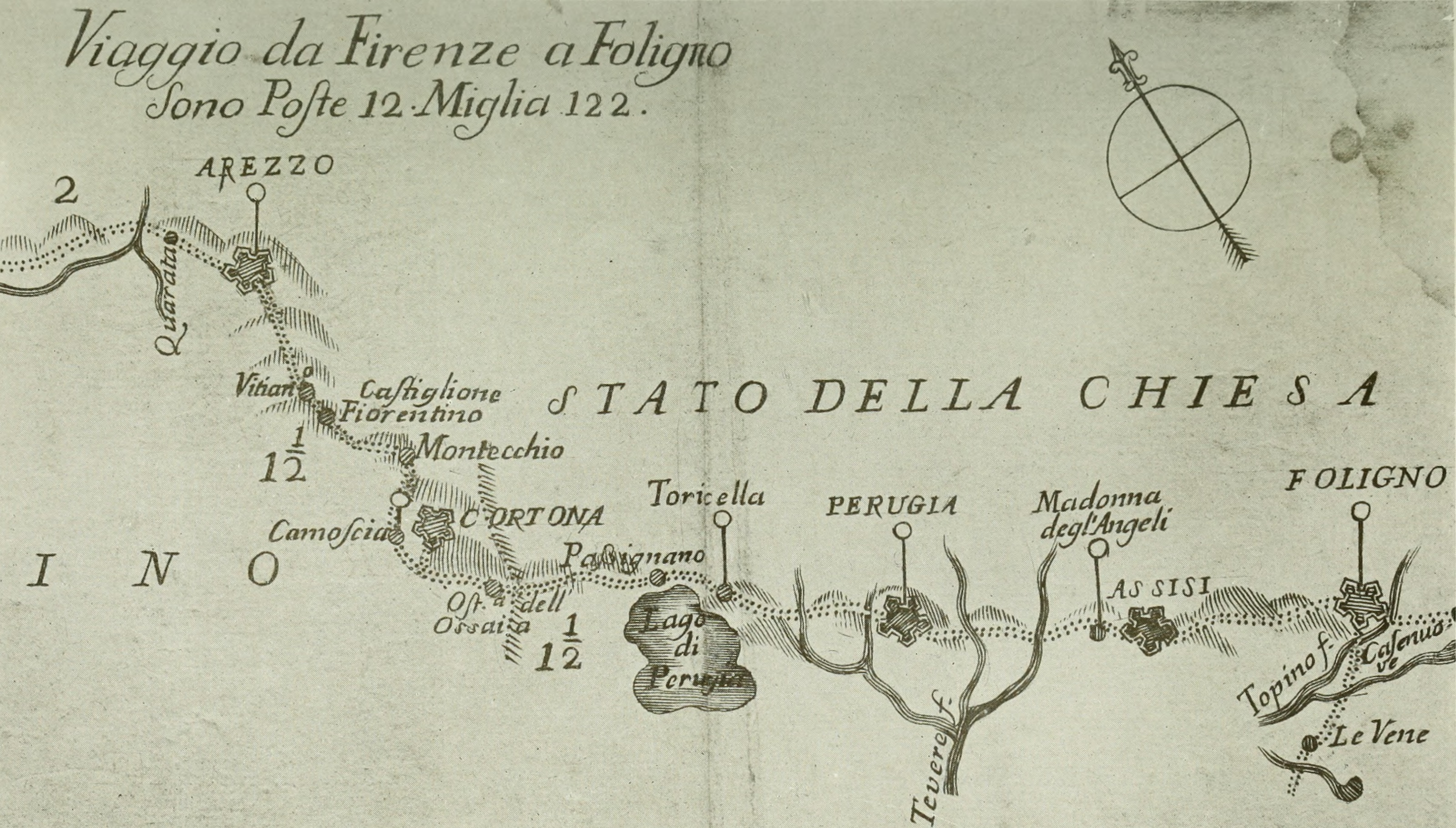
Map showing the road from Arezzo to Foligno.
