= Luria (play) =

1846 play by Robert Browning

- Written by: Robert Browning
- Original language: English
- Genre: Tragedy

Premiere
- Date premiered: 1846

Luria is a play by Robert Browning. It was first printed with A Soul's Tragedy as the concluding number of Bells and Pomegranates (No. VIII) in April 1846. It is a tragedy in blank verse.

== Characters ==
- Luria, a Moor, Commander of the Florentine Forces
- Husain, a Moor, his friend
- Puccio, the old Florentine Commander, now Luria's Chief Officer
- Braccio, Commissary of the Republic of Florence
- Jacopo (Lapo), his Secretary
- Tiburzio, Commander of the Pisans
- Domizia, a noble Florentine Lady

Time, 14—

== Sources ==
- Birch, Dinah, ed. (2009). "Luria". In The Oxford Companion to English Literature. 7th ed. Oxford University Press. Retrieved 20 October 2022.
- Scudder, Horace E. (1895). The Complete Poetic and Dramatic Works of Robert Browning. Boston and New York: Houghton, Mifflin and Co.; Cambridge: The Riverside Press. pp. 289, 299.
