= Paracelsus (poem) =

1835 poem by Robert Browning

Paracelsus is a five-part epic poem written by Robert Browning and published with end notes in 1835. The author inscribed the original edition to "his affectionate friend", the Comte A. de Ripert-Monclar, identified in a later edition as a private agent in England (between the Duchesse de Berri and her royalist friends in France) who had suggested the subject to Browning.

== Structure ==
The poem is split into five parts:

1. "Paracelsus Aspires"
2. "Paracelsus Attains"
3. "Paracelsus"
4. "Paracelsus Aspires"
5. "Paracelsus Attains".
