= Sordello (poem) =

Narrative poem by Robert Browning

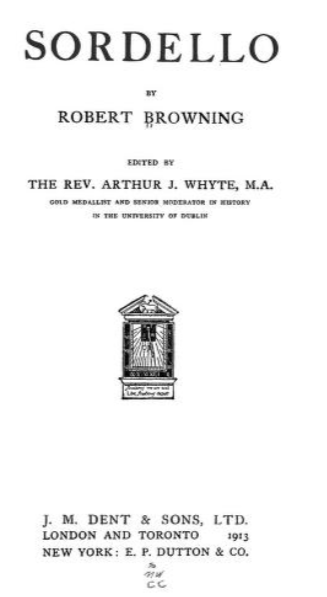
- Title page for Sordello (1913 edition)
- Author: Robert Browning
- Language: English
- Genre: Narrative poetry
- Publisher: Edward Moxon
- Publication date: March 1840
- Publication place: United Kingdom
- Media type: Print

Sordello is a narrative poem by the English poet Robert Browning. Worked on for seven years, and largely written between 1836 and 1840, it was published in March 1840. It consists of a fictionalised version of the life of Sordello da Goito, a 13th-century Lombard troubadour depicted in Canto VI of Dante Alighieri's Purgatorio.

The poem is convoluted and obscure, its difficulties increased by its unfamiliar setting. It was harshly received at the time of its publication: Alfred, Lord Tennyson's opinion was recorded thus by William Sharp in his biography of Browning:

Lord Tennyson manfully tackled it, but he is reported to have admitted in bitterness of spirit: "There were only two lines in it that I understood, and they were both lies; they were the opening and closing lines, 'Who will may hear Sordello's story told,' and 'Who would has heard Sordello's story told!'".

The poem was, however, championed decades later by Algernon Swinburne and Ezra Pound.

== Plot summary ==
The setting is northern Italy in the 1220s, dominated by the struggle between the Guelphs (partisans of the Pope) and the Ghibellines (partisans of the Holy Roman Emperor). Sordello is a Ghibelline, like his lord Ecelin II da Romano, and the soldier Taurello.

=== Book I ===
Browning begins by summoning the shades of all dead poets to listen to the story he has to tell. The one who intimidates him most is the "pale face[d]" Shelley (whom he does not name). The citizens of Verona have just heard that their Guelph prince, Count Richard of St Boniface, has been captured by Taurello Salinguerra.

Not long ago, Taurello had been lured away from Ferrara; in his absence, his palaces were burned by Guelphs. On his return, he takes vengeance, and Azzo and Richard flee. They come back and besiege Ferrara, but when Richard is invited to a parley, he is captured. In a castle at Verona, the Council of Twenty-Four discuss the city's predicament; in a distant room, the poet Sordello sits motionless, thinking about his love, Palma.

Browning describes Sordello's childhood and youth as an orphaned page at the lonely castle of Goito, near Mantua. He spent nearly all his time wandering about the pine forest and marsh, and had little human company other than the elderly servants; what he knew about the world he knew by hearsay. Sometimes he would stare at a stone font in a vault of the castle, dreaming that the female statues who held it up were under a curse, and that he could plead with God for their pardon and release. At other times he would indulge in daydreams about himself as a great hero, in whom all virtues, skills and powers would combine – in other words, as a reinvention of Apollo. Browning comments that an aesthete can fail in life either through attempting nothing, or attempting too much. Sordello once heard that the lady Palma was being wooed by the Guelph, Count Richard, and she became another subject of his daydreams.

=== Book II ===
Sordello is wandering through the wood towards Mantua, daydreaming about Palma, when he comes upon a crowd gathered by the city's wall. They are listening to the aged troubador Eglamor. Impatient with Eglamor's feeble efforts, Sordello interrupts him and continues his song so effectively that, to his own astonishment, he wins the prize, and Palma bestows upon him her scarf. Eglamor responds graciously to his defeat, but walks home alone and troubled, and dies the same night. At his funeral, Sordello praises him highly. Eglamor's jongleur, Naddo, becomes Sordello's jongleur.

Sordello, long reluctant to do so, finally enquires about his birth and origins. He is told that he was the son of an archer who saved the lives of Adelaide and Palma when they were nearly killed by a fire set by Ecelin himself. Disappointed, Sordello then gives up the plan of becoming a "man of action", and devotes himself to minstrelsy, but quickly becomes bored and slapdash; he tries reinventing his language to express his visions more directly, but encounters public incomprehension and personal fatigue. Sordello is deeply divided between his conceptions of poet as profession and poet as destiny.

The lady Adelaide dies suddenly; then the news comes that Ecelin II has resolved to retire to a monastery. Taurello confronts his lord on horseback, but is unable to make him change his mind. Taurello is thus forced to abandon his plan to join the Emperor on a new Crusade. He travels to Mantua, where Sordello is appointed to welcome him with song, but the baffled troubadour, lacking inspiration, wanders back to Goito.

=== Book III ===
At Goito, Sordello re-immerses himself in his daydreams for a whole year, but he has lost his self-confidence, and he begins to wonder if he had thrown over all prospect of success as an ordinary human being, let alone as an Apollo. He concludes that he had been a narcissist, whose lack of devotion to anything outside of himself had been his ruin. His bitter musings are interrupted by Naddo, who brings news that he has been summoned to Verona to sing at Palma's wedding with Count Richard. But when Sordello arrives at Verona, Palma meets him and confesses her love for him. (At this point, the narrative returns to where it began at the start of Book I.)

The death of Adelaide and the withdrawal of Ecelin has made it possible for her to confess her love to Sordello and ask him to marry her. This would make him the head of the House of Romano; in fact, Taurello approves strongly, as it would make an alliance with the Guelphs unnecessary.

(Browning had written this much of the poem when in 1838 he travelled to Italy for the first time. With contemporary Venice as a background, the rest of Book III consists of a discussion of his own hopes for the future, and his reasons for writing Sordello.)

=== Book IV ===
Ferrara has been destroyed; envoys of the Lombard League arrive to negotiate a ransom for Count Richard. Sordello, too, arrives in Ferrara, making the long journey at the risk of his precarious health. He had planned to visit Azzo VII, camped outside the city, but first he goes to the palace of San Pietro to talk to Taurello Salinguerra. He is appalled by Taurello's explanation of the Ghibelline policy. He walks stunned through the city, and, on meeting the delegates from Verona, sings for them at their request; one of them turns out to be Palma in disguise.

Back in the palace, Taurello ponders the events of his life (the theft of his first fiancée by Azzo VI, his plotting with Ecelin II to win back Ferrara, and the loss of his wife and child while fleeing from Vicenza), and briefly toys with the idea of taking Ecelin II's place.

Sordello converses with Palma, and declares himself disgusted with both the Guelphs and the Ghibellines: both sides pursue selfish ends and exploit the common people. He conceives the idea of building a City of God in which Christendom can be reunited. At dawn he leaps up to meet the ordinary folk and to sketch the foundation of his plans in his mind.

=== Book V ===
By sunset, Sordello has already concluded his dream is impracticable. Even if the Utopia could be brought into being overnight by a single genius, the ideal city would crumble instantly when transferred into the hands of ordinary sinners. But he then realises his mistake: failure to accept that lasting progress can only be made one step at a time. He has already decided that the Guelphs represent the common people's interests more closely, because they subordinate, at least in principle, the momentary dominions procured by strength and cunning to the eternal dominion of God and His law. He concludes that his immediate duty is to convince Taurello to take up the Guelph cause and keep the Emperor away from Lombardy.

Sordello goes to Taurello and Palma and delivers his pitch, but his curiosity to see what effect his speech is having on the soldier robs his long disused voice of emotion, and Taurello responds with puzzled amusement, and then with sarcasm. Sordello's pride is touched, and, realising that this will be his last chance to express himself in any consequential way, he defends with eloquence the concept of poetry as a calling higher than any other.

When he has finished, Taurello shrugs and admits that his own life's work, seemingly more substantial, has been demolished by Ecelin's abdication, and impulsively throws the Imperial baldric on Sordello's neck, declaring him head of the house of Romano. A strange intuition arises in both. It is then that Palma confesses what she has known for more than a year: Sordello is Taurello's son, the child he thought had perished at Vicenza.

Sordello desires to be left alone; Taurello and Palma go downstairs, where Taurello, excited out of his wits, starts to unfold a mad project to ignore both Emperor and Pope and build a new centre of power on the house of Romano.

=== Book VI ===
Sordello debates with himself about his best course of action. Should he persist in his determination to throw in his lot with the Guelphs, or does his sudden elevation to the status of a Ghibelline leader imply that his destiny lies with them? Would the common people benefit from the triumph of the Guelphs? Can he expect to fulfil any of his hopes at all, or would it be wiser to see to his own happiness, even at the expense of his new subordinates? He concludes that his previous failures have been a result of the failure to accept the limitations inherent in being human, and his reluctance to devote himself to a single end, or to a single cherished person.

He throws the Imperial emblem to the floor. The stress of this moment is too much, and when Taurello and Palma return, they find that he has collapsed and died.

Taurello's hopes of rising in the world are dashed. He marries Sophia, a daughter of Ecelin II, and dwindles into an unremarkable old age, eventually being captured and exiled to Venice. The Ghibelline cause triumphs through the ruthlessness of Ecelin III and Alberic.

Sordello's career is inflated by chroniclers and he is misremembered as a statesman and hero. Nothing authentic remains of his life, apart from a fragment of the Goito lay, his first and least remarkable song.

== Historical persons ==
=== Guelphs ===
Pope Honorius III
He was pope from 1216 to 1226.

Count Richard of St Boniface (Bonifacio), prince of Verona
His emblem is the "purple pavis"; he is called "the ounce".

Azzo VII, of Este (1205–1264)
Called "the lion" or "the lynx".

=== Ghibellines ===
Kaiser Friedrich II (1194–1250) of Hohenstauffen
More usually known as Frederick II, Holy Roman Emperor. Son of Henry VI and grandson of Friedrich Barbarossa. Crowned by Pope Honorius in 1220. His second wife was Yolande, the daughter of John of Brienne. Friedrich's decision to forswear crusading is given as the origin of his present conflict with the Pope, and the reason for his first excommunication, by Gregory IX, in 1227.

Taurello Salinguerra, of Ferrara
(Salinguerra Torelli) Called "the osprey".

Ecelin II Romano
(Ezzelino) Called "the hill-cat" because of his alpine castle; his emblem was actually an ostrich with a horse-shoe in its mouth. The great-grandson of the relatively powerless Ecelo, a Saxon who introduced Imperial power into northern Italy. He was married first to Agnes of Este, then to Adelaide. After decades of campaigning he retires to a monastery at Oliero, to the despair of Taurello.

Sordello
A page, later a celebrated poet who discovers he is the son of Taurello.

Palma
Sordello's lover, the only child of Ecelin II by Agnes of Este. (The historical Palma was Adelaide's child.)

Eglamor
An elderly minstrel who is defeated by Sordello. (Fictional.)

Naddo
Jongleur and friend to Sordello. (Fictional.)
