= Robert Browning =

English poet and playwright (1812–1889)

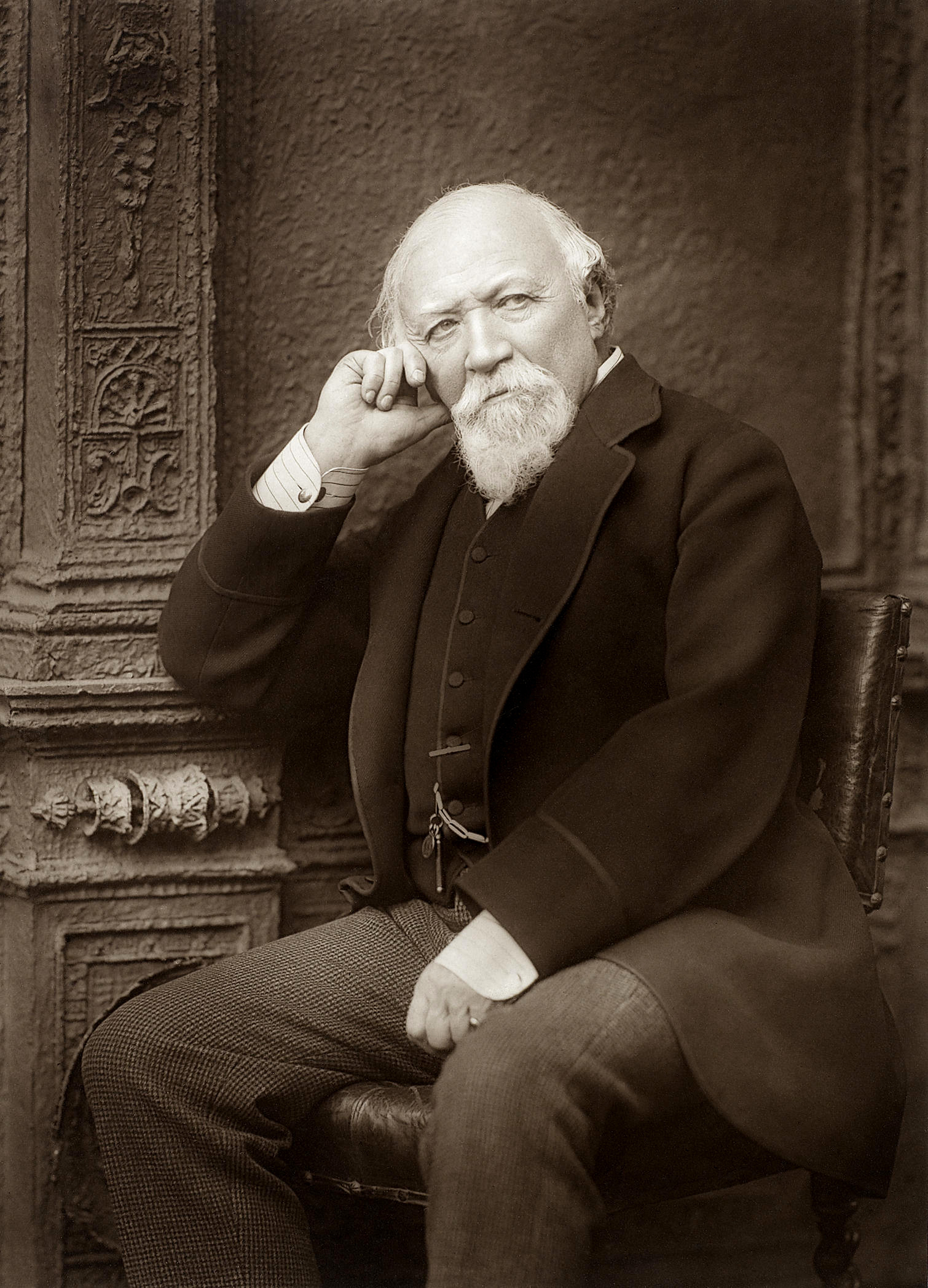
- Portrait by Herbert Rose Barraud, c. 1888
- Born: 7 May 1812; Camberwell, Surrey, England
- Died: 12 December 1889 (aged 77); Venice, Italy
- Resting place: Westminster Abbey
- Education: University College London
- Occupation: Poet
- Spouse: Elizabeth Barrett (m. 1846; died 1861)
- Children: Robert Barrett ("Pen")
- Writing career
- Notable works: Men and Women; The Ring and the Book; Dramatis Personae; Dramatic Lyrics (incl. "My Last Duchess" and "The Pied Piper of Hamelin"); Dramatic Romances and Lyrics; Asolando
- Movement: Victorian

Robert Browning (7 May 1812 – 12 December 1889) was an English poet and playwright whose dramatic monologues put him high among the Victorian poets. He was noted for irony, characterisation, dark humour, social commentary, historical settings and challenging vocabulary and syntax.

His early long poems Pauline (1833) and Paracelsus (1835) were acclaimed, but his reputation dwindled for a time – his 1840 poem Sordello was seen as wilfully obscure – and took over a decade to recover, by which time he had moved from Shelleyan forms to a more personal style. In 1846, he married fellow poet Elizabeth Barrett and moved to Italy. By her death in 1861, he had published the collection Men and Women (1855). His Dramatis Personae (1864) and book-length epic poem The Ring and the Book (1868–1869) made him a leading poet. By his death in 1889, he was seen as a sage and philosopher-poet who had fed into Victorian social and political discourse. Societies for studying his work survived in Britain and the US into the 20th century.

== Biography ==
=== Early years ===
Browning was born in Walworth in the parish of Camberwell, Surrey, which now forms part of the Borough of Southwark in south London. He was baptised on 14 June 1812, at Lock's Fields Independent Chapel, York Street, Walworth, the only son of Sarah Anna (née Wiedemann) and Robert Browning. His father was a well-paid clerk for the Bank of England, earning about £150 per year. Browning's paternal grandfather was a slave owner in Saint Kitts, West Indies, but Browning's father was an abolitionist. Browning's father had been sent to the West Indies to work on a sugar plantation but returned to England following a slave revolt. Browning's mother was the daughter of a German shipowner who had settled in Dundee, Scotland with his Scottish wife. His paternal grandmother, Margaret Tittle, had inherited a plantation in St Kitts and was rumoured in the family to have a mixed-race ancestry including some Jamaican blood, but author Julia Markus suggests she was Kittitian rather than Jamaican. The evidence is inconclusive. Robert's father, a literary collector, had a library of some 6,000 books; many of them were rare so that Robert grew up in a household with significant literary resources. His mother, to whom he was close, was a devout nonconformist and a talented musician. His younger sister, Sarianna, also gifted, became her brother's companion in his later years, after the death of his wife in 1861. His father encouraged his children's interest in literature and the arts.

By the age of 12, Browning had written a book of poetry, which he later destroyed for want of a publisher. After attending one or two private schools and showing an insuperable dislike of school life, he was educated at home by a tutor, using the resources of his father's library. By 14 he was fluent in French, Greek, Italian and Latin. He became an admirer of the Romantic poets, especially Shelley, whom he followed in becoming an atheist and a vegetarian. At 16, he studied Greek at University College London, but left after his first year. His parents' evangelical faith prevented his studying at either Oxford or Cambridge University, both then open only to members of the Church of England. He had inherited substantial musical ability through his mother, and composed arrangements of various songs. He refused a formal career and ignored his parents' remonstrations by dedicating himself to poetry. He stayed at home until the age of 34, financially dependent on his family until his marriage. His father sponsored the publication of his son's poems.

=== First published works ===
Waring (ll. 192–200)

Some one shall somehow run a muck
With this old world, for want of strife
Sound asleep: contrive, contrive
To rouse us, Waring! Who's alive?
Our men scarce seem in earnest now:
Distinguished names!—but 'tis, somehow,
As if they played at being names
Still more distinguished, like the games
Of children.

— Bells and Pomegranates No. III: Dramatic Lyrics (1842)

In March 1833, "Pauline, a Fragment of a Confession" was published anonymously by Saunders and Otley at the expense of the author, Robert Browning, who received the money from his aunt, Mrs Silverthorne. It is a long poem composed in homage to the poet Shelley and somewhat in his style. Originally Browning considered Pauline as the first of a series written by different aspects of himself, but he soon abandoned this idea. The press noticed the publication. W. J. Fox writing in The Monthly Repository of April 1833 discerned merit in the work. Allan Cunningham praised it in the Athenaeum. However, it sold no copies. Some years later, probably in 1850, Dante Gabriel Rossetti came across it in the Reading Room of the British Museum and wrote to Browning, then in Florence, to ask if he was the author. John Stuart Mill, however, wrote that the author suffered from an "intense and morbid self-consciousness". Later Browning was rather embarrassed by the work, and only included it in his collected poems of 1868 after making substantial changes and adding a preface in which he asked for indulgence for a boyish work.

In 1834, he accompanied the Chevalier George de Benkhausen, the Russian consul-general, on a brief visit to St Petersburg and began Paracelsus, which was published in 1835. The subject of the 16th-century savant and alchemist was probably suggested to him by the Comte Amédée de Ripart-Monclar, to whom it was dedicated. The publication had some commercial and critical success, being noticed by Wordsworth, Dickens, Landor, J. S. Mill and the already famous Tennyson. It is a monodrama without action, dealing with the problems confronting an intellectual trying to find his role in society. It gained him access to the London literary world.

As a result of his new contacts he met Macready, who invited him to write a play. Strafford was performed five times. Browning then wrote two other plays, one of which was not performed, while the other failed, Browning having fallen out with Macready.

In 1838, he visited Italy looking for background for Sordello, a long poem in heroic couplets, presented as the imaginary biography of the Mantuan bard spoken of by Dante in the Divine Comedy, canto 6 of Purgatory, set against a background of hate and conflict during the wars of the Guelphs and Ghibellines. This was published in 1840 and met with widespread derision, gaining him the reputation of wanton carelessness and obscurity. Tennyson, jokingly, commented that he only understood the first and last lines. Jane Welsh Carlyle, wife of Thomas Carlyle (a friend of Browning's who deeply influenced Browning's poetry), quipped that she read the poem through and "could not tell whether Sordello was a [sic] 'a book, a city, or a man'".

Browning's reputation began to make a partial recovery with the publication, 1841–1846, of Bells and Pomegranates, a series of eight pamphlets, originally intended just to include his plays. Fortunately for Browning's career, his publisher, Moxon, persuaded him to include some "dramatic lyrics", some of which had already appeared in periodicals.

=== Marriage ===
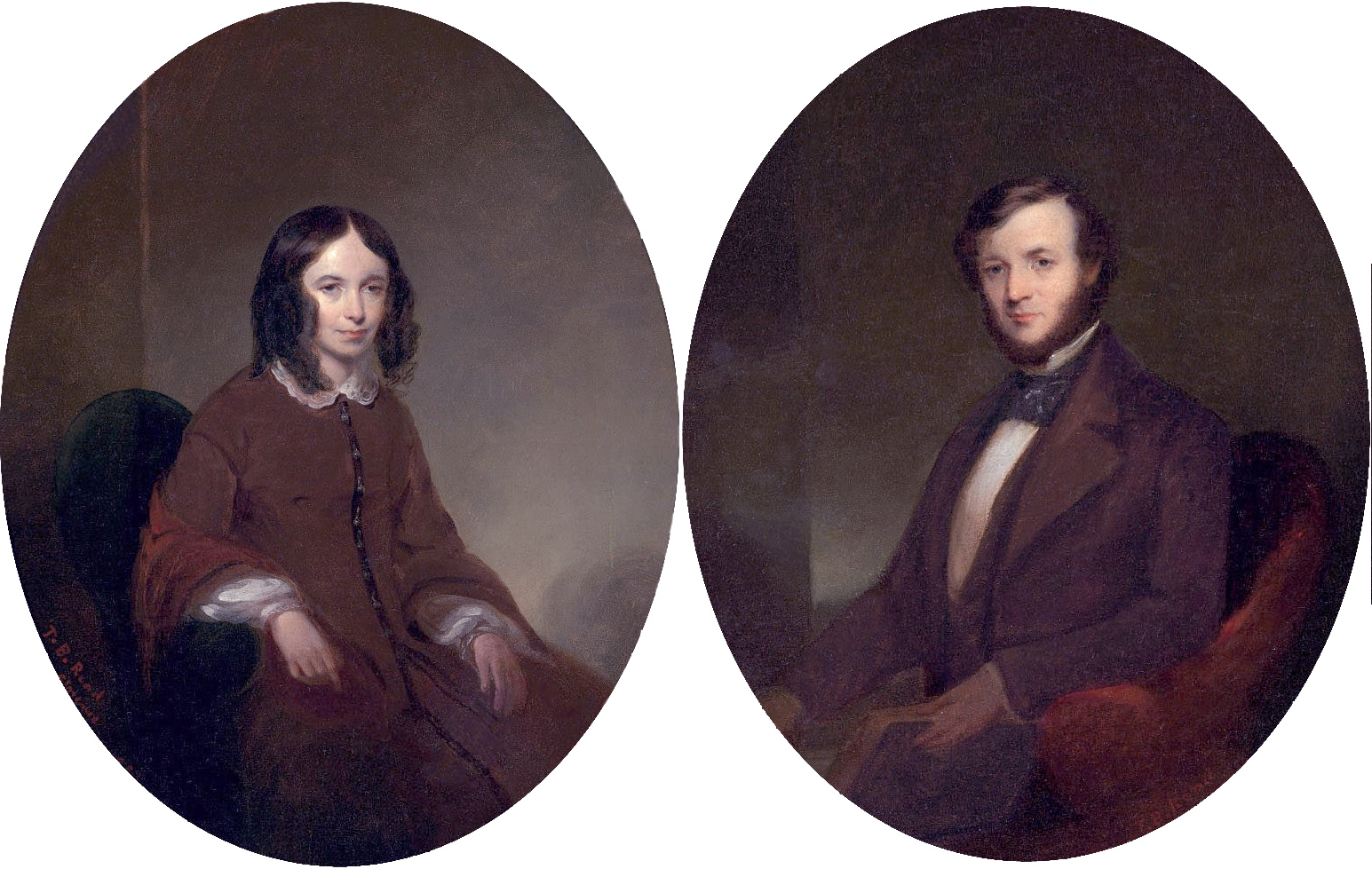
Portraits of Elizabeth Barrett Browning and Robert Browning.

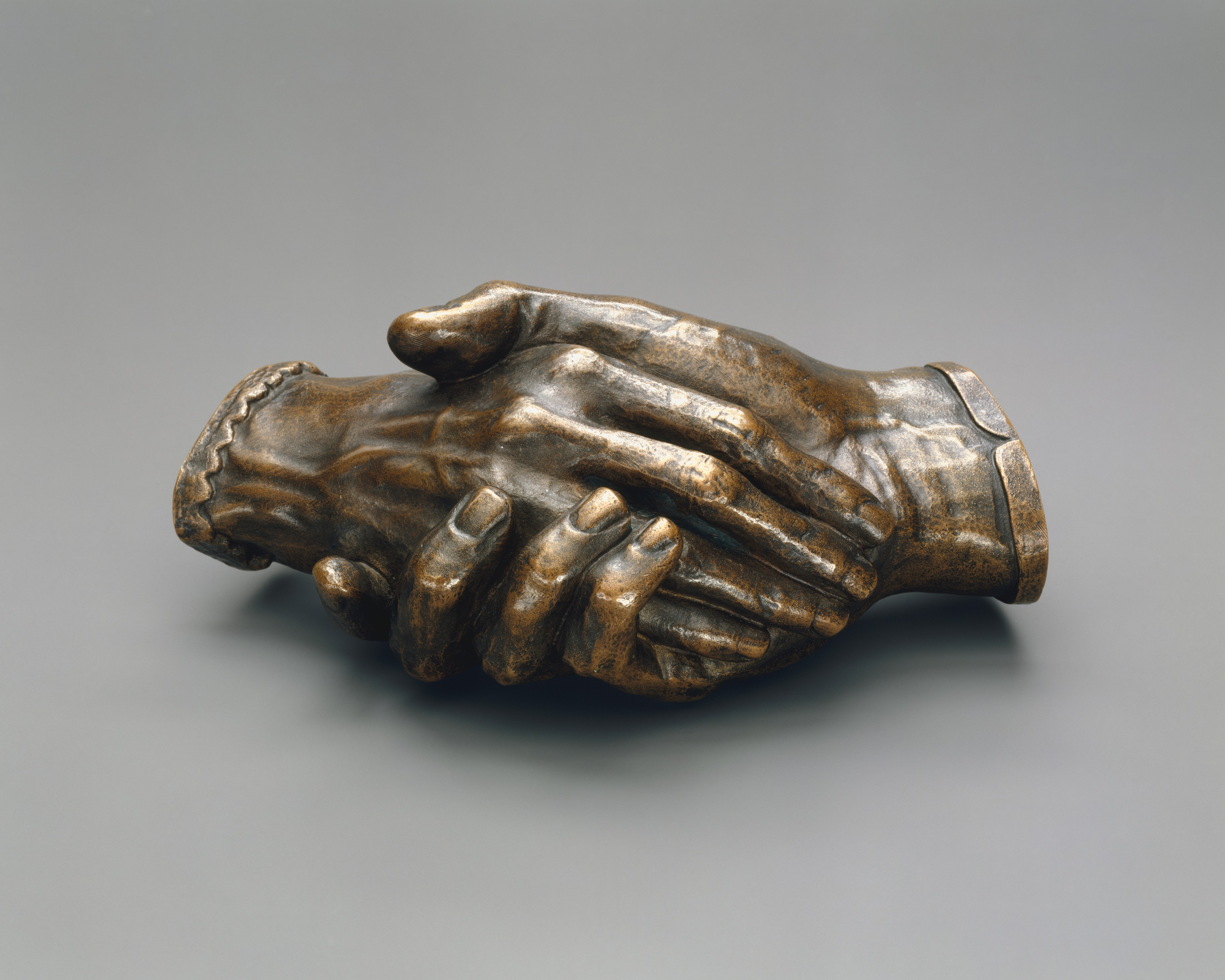
Clasped Hands of Robert and Elizabeth Barrett Browning, 1853 by Harriet Hosmer.

In 1845, Browning met the poet Elizabeth Barrett, six years his senior, who lived as a semi-invalid in her father's house in Wimpole Street, London. They began regularly corresponding and gradually a romance developed between them, leading to their marriage and journey to Italy (for Elizabeth's health) on 12 September 1846. The marriage was initially secret because Elizabeth's domineering father disapproved of marriage for any of his children. Mr. Barrett disinherited Elizabeth, as he did each of his children who married: "The Mrs. Browning of popular imagination was a sweet, innocent young woman who suffered endless cruelties at the hands of a tyrannical papa but who nonetheless had the good fortune to fall in love with a dashing and handsome poet named Robert Browning." At her husband's insistence, the second edition of Elizabeth's Poems included her love sonnets. The book increased her popularity and high critical regard, cementing her position as an eminent Victorian poet. Upon William Wordsworth's death in 1850, she was a serious contender to become Poet Laureate, the position eventually going to Tennyson.

From the time of their marriage and until Elizabeth's death, the Brownings lived in Italy, residing first in Pisa, and then, within a year, finding an apartment in Florence at Casa Guidi (now a museum to their memory). Their only child, Robert Wiedemann Barrett Browning, nicknamed "Penini" or "Pen", was born in 1849. In these years Browning was fascinated by, and learned from, the art and atmosphere of Italy. He would, in later life, describe Italy as his university. As Elizabeth had inherited money of her own, the couple were reasonably comfortable in Italy, and their relationship together was happy. However, the literary assault on Browning's work did not let up and he was critically dismissed further, by patrician writers such as Charles Kingsley, for deserting England.

=== Political views ===
Browning identified as a liberal, supported the emancipation of women, and opposed slavery, expressing sympathy for the North in the American Civil War. Later in life, he even championed animal rights in several poems attacking vivisection. He was also a stalwart opponent of anti-Semitism, leading to speculation that Browning himself was Jewish. In 1877 he wrote a poem explaining "Why I am a Liberal" in which he declared: "Who then dares hold – emancipated thus / His fellow shall continue bound? Not I." Critical attention to Browning's politics has, in general, been sparse. Isobel Armstrong's writing on dramatic monologues, as well as more recent work on the influence of Coriolanus on Browning's politics, has attempted to situate the poet's political sensibility at the centre of his practice.

=== Religious beliefs ===
Browning was raised in an evangelical non-conformist household. However, after his reading of Shelley he is said to have briefly become an atheist. Browning is also said to have made an uncharacteristic admission of faith to Alfred Domett, when he is said to have admired Byron's poetry "as a Christian". Poems such as "Christmas-Eve and Easter-Day" seem to confirm this Christian faith, strengthened by his wife. However, many have dismissed the usefulness of these works at discovering Browning's own religious views due to the consistent use of dramatic monologue which regularly expresses hypothetical views which cannot be ascribed to the author himself.

=== Spiritualism incident ===
Mr. Sludge, "The Medium" (opening lines)

Now, don't, sir! Don't expose me! Just this once!
This was the first and only time, I'll swear,—
Look at me,—see, I kneel,—the only time,
I swear, I ever cheated,—yes, by the soul
Of Her who hears—(your sainted mother, sir!)
All, except this last accident, was truth—
This little kind of slip!—and even this,
It was your own wine, sir, the good champagne,
(I took it for Catawba—you're so kind)
Which put the folly in my head!

— Dramatis Personae (1864)

Browning believed spiritualism to be fraud, and proved one of Daniel Dunglas Home's most adamant critics. When Browning and his wife Elizabeth attended one of his séances on 23 July 1855, a spirit face materialized, which Home claimed was Browning's son who had died in infancy: Browning seized the "materialization" and discovered it to be Home's bare foot. To make the deception worse, Browning had never lost a son in infancy.

After the séance, Browning wrote an angry letter to The Times, in which he said: "the whole display of hands, spirit utterances etc., was a cheat and imposture." In 1902 Browning's son Pen wrote: "Home was detected in a vulgar fraud." Elizabeth, however, was convinced that the phenomena she witnessed were genuine, and her discussions about Home with her husband were a constant source of disagreement.

=== Major works ===
How It Strikes a Contemporary (ll. 21–33)

He stood and watched the cobbler at his trade,
The man who slices lemons into drink,
The coffee-roaster's brazier, and the boys
That volunteer to help him turn its winch.
He glanced o'er books on stalls with half an eye,
And fly-leaf ballads on the vendor's string,
And broad-edge bold-print posters by the wall.
He took such cognizance of men and things,
If any beat a horse, you felt he saw;
If any cursed a woman, he took note;
Yet stared at nobody—you stared at him,
And found, less to your pleasure than surprise,
He seemed to know you and expect as much.

— Men and Women (1855)

In Florence, probably from early in 1853, Browning worked on the poems that eventually composed his two-volume Men and Women, for which he is now well known, although in 1855, when they were published, they made relatively little impact.

In 1861, Elizabeth died in Florence. Among those whom he found consoling in that period was the novelist and poet Isa Blagden, with whom he and his wife had had a voluminous correspondence. The following year Browning returned to London, taking Pen with him, who by then was 12 years old. They made their home in 17 Warwick Crescent, Maida Vale. It was only when he became part of the London literary scene—albeit while paying frequent visits to Italy (though never again to Florence)—that his reputation started to take off.

In 1868, after five years' work, he completed and published the long blank-verse poem The Ring and the Book. Based on a convoluted murder-case from 1690s Rome, the poem is composed of 12 books: essentially 10 lengthy dramatic monologues narrated by various characters in the story, showing their individual perspectives on events, bookended by an introduction and conclusion by Browning himself. Long even by Browning's standards (over twenty-thousand lines), The Ring and the Book was his most ambitious project and is arguably his greatest work; it has been called a tour de force of dramatic poetry. Published in four parts from November 1868 to February 1869, the poem was a success both commercially and critically, and finally brought Browning the renown he had sought for nearly 40 years. The Robert Browning Society was formed in 1881 and his work was recognised as belonging within the British literary canon.

=== Last years and death ===
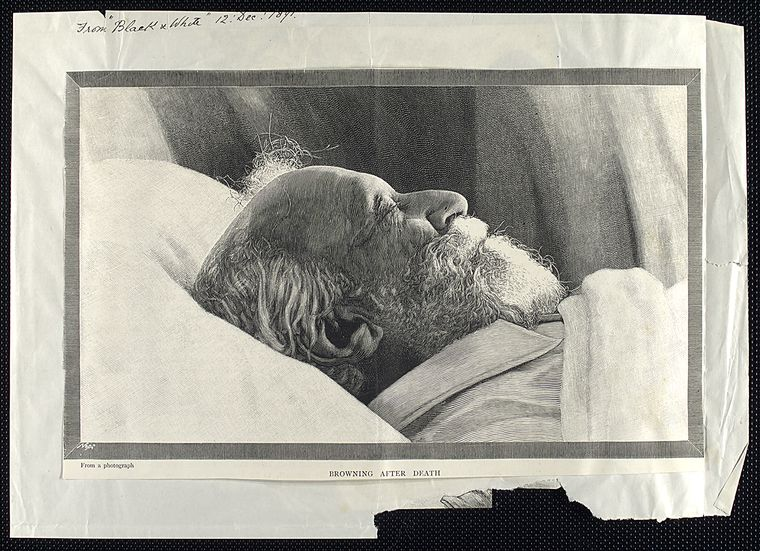
Browning after death.

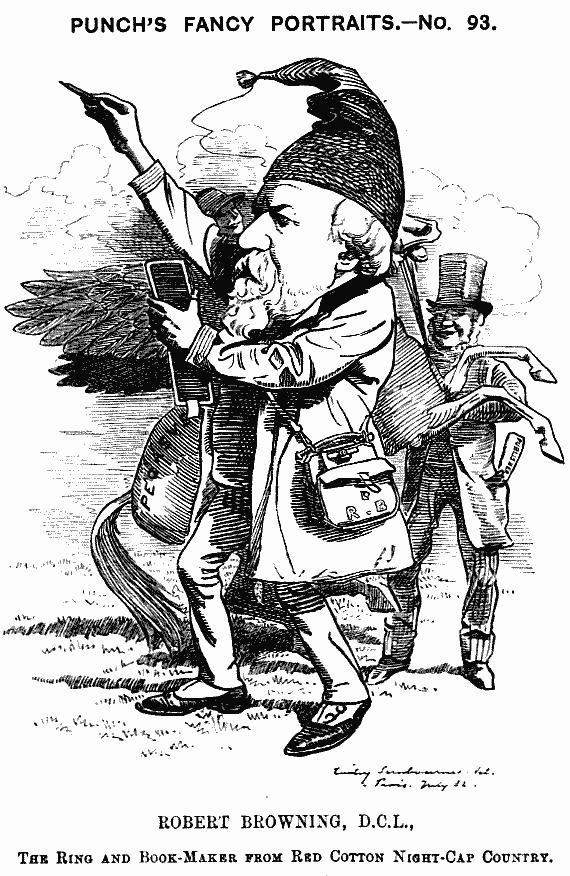
1882 caricature from Punch reading: "The Ring and Bookmaker from Red Cotton Nightcap country"

In the remaining years of his life Browning travelled extensively. After a series of long poems published in the early 1870s, of which Balaustion's Adventure and Red Cotton Night-Cap Country were the best-received, the volume Pacchiarotto, and How He Worked in Distemper included an attack against Browning's critics, especially Alfred Austin, who was later to become Poet Laureate. According to some reports Browning became romantically involved with Louisa Caroline Stewart-Mackenzie, Lady Ashburton, but he refused her proposal of marriage, and did not remarry. In 1878, he revisited Italy for the first time in the seventeen years since Elizabeth's death, and returned there on several further occasions. In 1887, Browning produced the major work of his later years, Parleyings with Certain People of Importance in Their Day. It finally presented the poet speaking in his own voice, engaging in a series of dialogues with long-forgotten figures of literary, artistic, and philosophic history. The Victorian public was baffled by this, and Browning returned to the brief, concise lyric for his last volume, Asolando (1889), published on the day of his death.

Browning died at his son's home Ca' Rezzonico in Venice on 12 December 1889. He was buried in Poets' Corner in Westminster Abbey; his grave now lies immediately adjacent to that of Alfred Tennyson.

During his life Browning was awarded many distinctions. He was made LL.D. of Edinburgh, a life Governor of London University, and had the offer of the Lord Rectorship of Glasgow. But he turned down anything that involved public speaking.

== History of sound recording ==
How They Brought The Good News From Ghent To Aix
Browning reciting "How They Brought The Good News From Ghent To Aix"

At a dinner party on 7 April 1889, at the home of Browning's friend the artist Rudolf Lehmann, an Edison cylinder phonograph recording was made on a white wax cylinder by Edison's British representative, George Gouraud. In the recording, which still exists, Browning recites part of How They Brought the Good News from Ghent to Aix (and can be heard apologising when he forgets the words). When the recording was played in 1890 on the anniversary of his death, at a gathering of his admirers, it was said to be the first time anyone's voice "had been heard from beyond the grave."

== Legacy ==
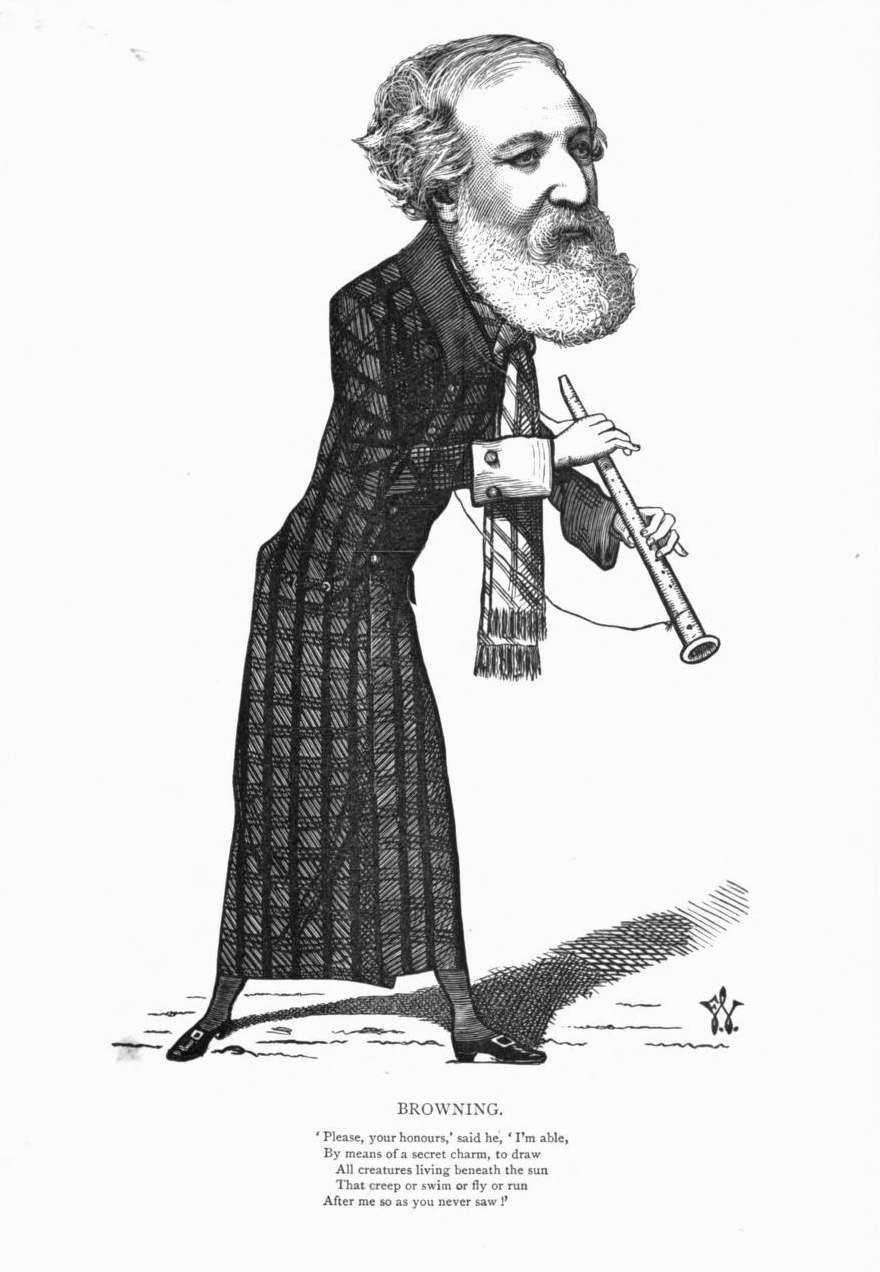
Caricature by Frederick Waddy (1873)

Browning's admirers have tended to temper their praise with reservations about the length and difficulty of his most ambitious poems, particularly Sordello and, to a lesser extent, The Ring and the Book. Nevertheless, they have included such eminent writers as Henry James, Oscar Wilde, George Bernard Shaw, G. K. Chesterton, Ezra Pound, Graham Greene, Evelyn Waugh, Jorge Luis Borges, and Vladimir Nabokov. Among living writers, Stephen King's The Dark Tower series, A. S. Byatt's Possession, and Maggie O'Farrell's The Marriage Portrait refer directly to Browning's work.

Today Browning's critically most esteemed poems include the monologues Childe Roland to the Dark Tower Came, Fra Lippo Lippi, Andrea Del Sarto, and My Last Duchess. His most popular poems include Porphyria's Lover, How They Brought the Good News from Ghent to Aix, the diptych Meeting at Night, the patriotic Home Thoughts from Abroad, and the children's poem The Pied Piper of Hamelin. His abortive dinner-party recital of How They Brought The Good News was recorded on an Edison wax cylinder, and is believed to be one of the oldest surviving recordings made in the United Kingdom of a notable person (a recording of Sir Arthur Sullivan's voice was made about six months earlier).

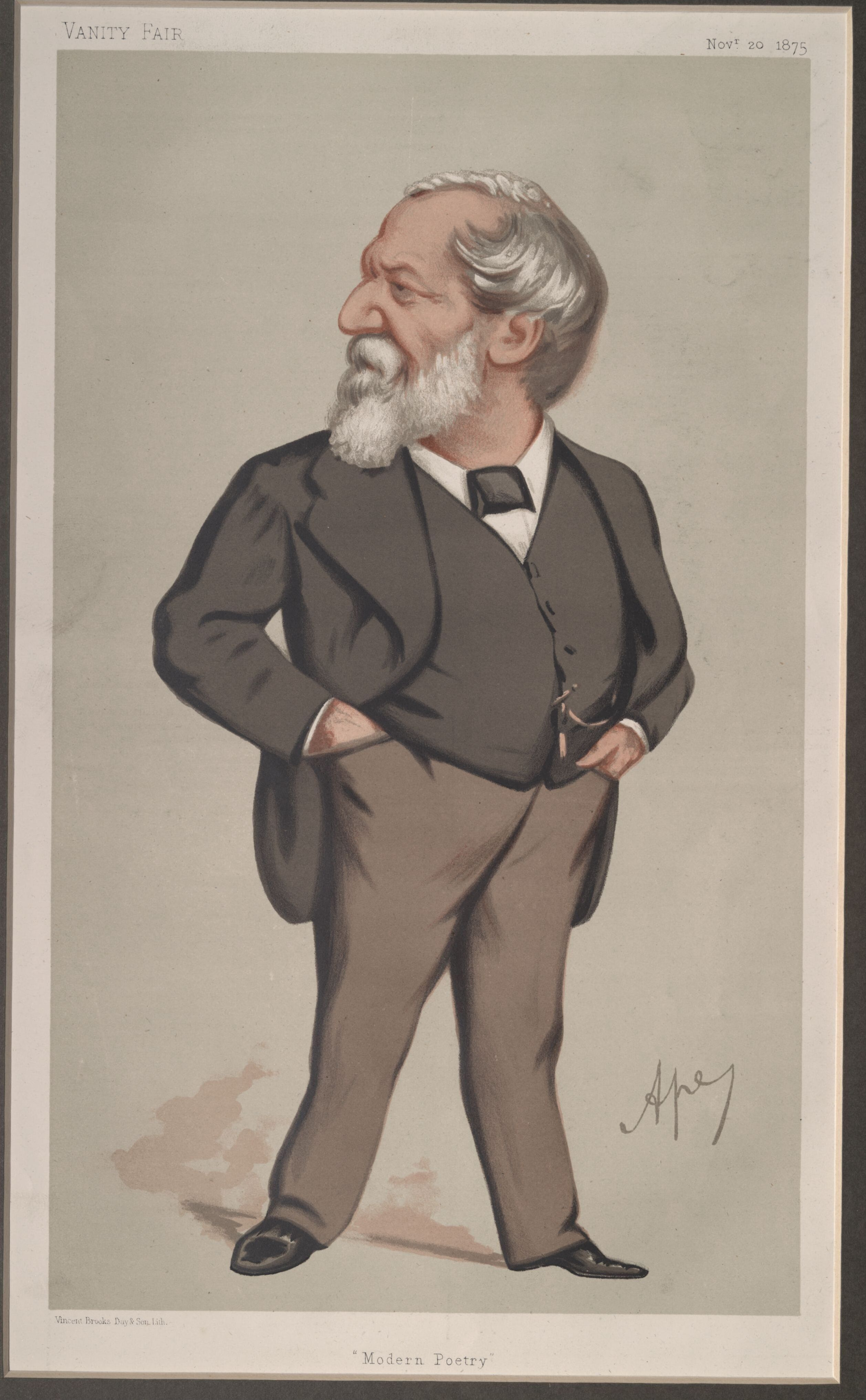
Captioned "Modern Poetry", caricature of Browning in Vanity Fair, 1875

Browning is now popularly known for such poems as Porphyria's Lover, My Last Duchess, How They Brought the Good News from Ghent to Aix, and The Pied Piper of Hamelin, and also for certain famous lines: "Grow old along with me!" (Rabbi Ben Ezra), "A man's reach should exceed his grasp" and "Less is more" (Andrea Del Sarto), "It was roses, roses all the way" (The Patriot), and "God's in His heaven—All's right with the world!" (Pippa Passes).

His critical reputation has traditionally rested mainly on his dramatic monologues, in which the words not only convey setting and action but reveal the speaker's character. In a Browning monologue, unlike a soliloquy, the meaning is not what the speaker voluntarily reveals but what he inadvertently gives away, usually while rationalising past actions or special pleading his case to a silent auditor. These monologues have been influential, and today the best of them are often treated by teachers and lecturers as paradigm cases of the monologue form. One such example used by teachers today is his satirisation of the sadistic attitude in his Soliloquy in a Spanish Cloister. Ian Jack, in his introduction to the Oxford University Press edition of Browning's poems 1833–1864, comments that Thomas Hardy, Rudyard Kipling, Ezra Pound and T. S. Eliot "all learned from Browning's exploration of the possibilities of dramatic poetry and of colloquial idiom".

In Oscar Wilde's dialogue The Critic as Artist, Browning is given a famously ironical assessment: "He is the most Shakespearean creature since Shakespeare. If Shakespeare could sing with myriad lips, Browning could stammer through a thousand mouths. [...] Yes, Browning was great. And as what will he be remembered? As a poet? Ah, not as a poet! He will be remembered as a writer of fiction, as the most supreme writer of fiction, it may be, that we have ever had. His sense of dramatic situation was unrivalled, and, if he could not answer his own problems, he could at least put problems forth, and what more should an artist do? Considered from the point of view of a creator of character he ranks next to him who made Hamlet. Had he been articulate, he might have sat beside him. The only man who can touch the hem of his garment is George Meredith. Meredith is a prose Browning, and so is Browning. He used poetry as a medium for writing in prose."

Probably the most adulatory judgment of Browning by a modern critic comes from Harold Bloom: "Browning is the most considerable poet in English since the major Romantics, surpassing his great contemporary rival Tennyson and the principal twentieth-century poets, including even Yeats, Hardy, and Wallace Stevens. But Browning is a very difficult poet, notoriously badly served by criticism, and ill-served also by his own accounts of what he was doing as a poet.... Yet when you read your way into his world, precisely his largest gift to you is his involuntary unfolding of one of the largest, most enigmatic, and most multipersoned literary and human selves you can hope to encounter." More recently, critics such as Annmarie Drury, Hédi A. Jaouad, and Joseph Hankinson have shifted to focus on Browning's surprising receptivity to other cultures, languages, and literary traditions.

His work has nevertheless had many detractors, and most of his voluminous output is not widely read. In a largely hostile essay Anthony Burgess wrote: "We all want to like Browning, but we find it very hard." Gerard Manley Hopkins and George Santayana were also critical. The latter expressed his views in the essay "The Poetry of Barbarism", which attacks Browning and Walt Whitman for what he regarded as their embrace of irrationality.

== Cultural references ==
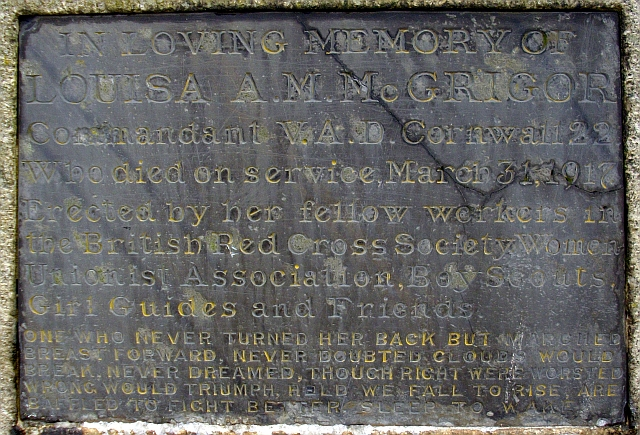
A memorial plaque for a member of the Voluntary Aid Detachment, engraved with a quotation from the Epilogue to Browning's Asolando. The inscription reads: "In Loving Memory of Louisa A. M. McGrigor Commandant V.A.D. Cornwall 22. Who died on service, March 31, 1917. Erected by her fellow workers in the British Red Cross Society, Women Unionist Association, Boy Scouts, Girl Guides and Friends. One who never turned her back but marched breast forward, Never doubted clouds would break, Never dreamed, though right were worsted, wrong would triumph, Held we fall to rise, are baffled to fight better, Sleep to wake."

American composer Frances Marion Ralston (1875-1952) used Browning’s text for her song "Rabbi Ben Ezra."

French composer Angèle Ravizé (1887-1980) used Browning’s text for her vocal quartet Voici le Printemps.

The young Henry Walford Davies made a musical setting of Prospice in 1894 for baritone and string quartet. Stephen Banfield rates it highly among musical settings of Browning, calling it "one of his few very powerful compositions". It has been recorded by Martin Oxenham and the Bingham String Quartet.

In 1914, the American modernist composer Charles Ives created the Robert Browning Overture, a dense and darkly dramatic piece with gloomy overtones reminiscent of the Second Viennese School.

In 1917, the U.S. composer Margaret Hoberg Turrell composed a song based on Browning's poem "Love: Such a Starved Bank of Moss". In 1920, the U.S. composer Anne Stratton composed one based on Browning's poem "Parting at Morning". Browning's poetry has also been set to music by Morfydd Owen, Amy Beach, and Ned Rorem.

In 1930, the story of Browning and his wife was made into the play The Barretts of Wimpole Street, by Rudolph Besier. It was a success and brought popular fame to the couple in the United States. The role of Elizabeth became a signature role for the actress Katharine Cornell. It was twice adapted into film. It was also the basis of the stage musical Robert and Elizabeth, with music by Ron Grainer and book and lyrics by Ronald Millar.

Terence Rattigan's play The Browning Version (1948) refers to a translation by the poet Robert Browning of Aeschylus's Agamemnon (1877). It was adapted in two films, one directed by Anthony Asquith in 1951 and the other directed by Mike Figgis in 1994.

Browning is an important character in Michael Dibdin's 1986 novel A rich full death.

In A.S. Byatt's 1990 novel Possession, the fictional Victorian poet Randolph Henry Ash is loosely based on Robert Browning. Ash writes 19th century dramatic monologues in the style of Browning, and conducts an epistolary courtship with a fictional poet (Christabel LaMotte) that echoes Browning's letters to Elizabeth Barrett.

"God's in his heaven – All's right in the world", an excerpt from his poem, "Pippa Passes", is the slogan for the fictional organisation NERV from Hideaki Anno's 1995 anime series Neon Genesis Evangelion.

A memorial plaque on the site of Browning's London home, in Warwick Crescent, Maida Vale, was unveiled on 11 December 1993.

Aalokam: Ranges of Vision, directed by Abhilash Babu is a 2023 Malayalam-language Indian film and it has six separate chapters and five of them are based on Robert Browning's poems.

== Collections ==
Material relating to the Brownings is found in many institutions across the world:

- The Armstrong Browning Library and Museum at Baylor University, Texas houses the world's largest collection of material relating to the Brownings, spanning books, correspondence, memorabilia and manuscripts. It was established in 1918 by A.J. Armstrong, who had become interested in the Brownings from 1905 - 1909 when he met their son Robert Barrett Browning.
- Balliol College, Oxford holds a collection of 'Browningiana' which was initially started by Browning himself after he met the master of Balliol, Benjamin Jowett, whilst seeking to send his son to the college. Balliol's collection contains manuscript material, relics, and published works.
- The Harry Ransom Center in Austin, Texas holds 8 boxes of correspondence and works relating to the Browning family.
- University College London Special Collections holds a collection of letters to Browning from various correspondents.
- The University of Leeds holds ten volumes of holograph poems by Browning.
- The Beinecke Rare Book and Manuscript Library at Yale University holds a mixed-provenance collection relating to both Robert Browning and Elizabeth Barrett Browning, which includes correspondence and manuscripts.

== List of works ==
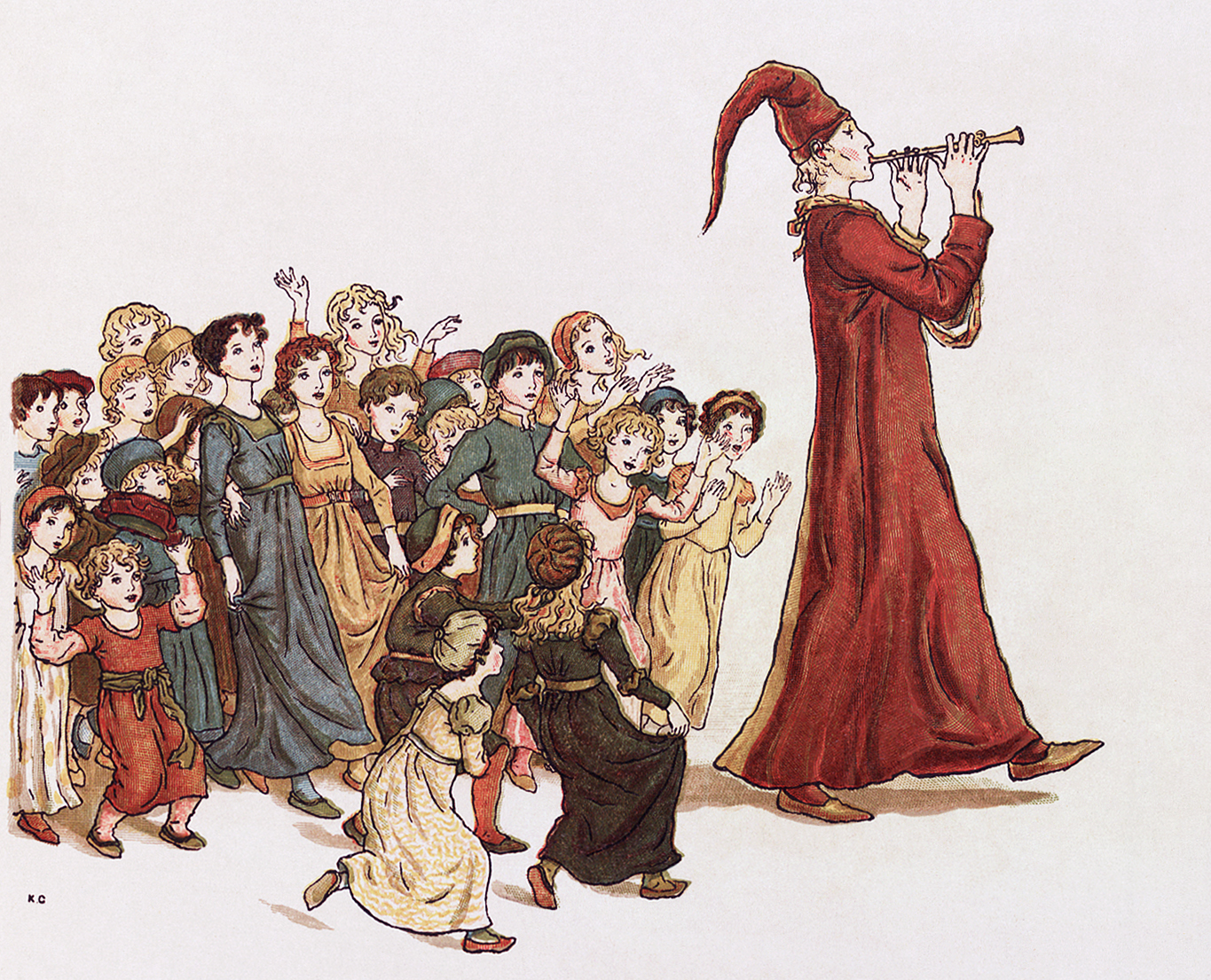
The Pied Piper leads the children out of Hamelin. Illustration by Kate Greenaway to the Robert Browning version of the tale.

This section lists the plays and volumes of poetry Browning published in his lifetime. Some individually notable poems are also listed, under the volumes in which they were published. (His only notable prose work, with the exception of his letters, is his Essay on Shelley.)

- Pauline: A Fragment of a Confession (1833)
- Paracelsus (1835)
- Strafford (play) (1837)
- Sordello (1840)
- Bells and Pomegranates (1841–46)
  - Bells and Pomegranates No. I: Pippa Passes (play) (1841)
    - The Year's at the Spring
  - Bells and Pomegranates No. II: King Victor and King Charles (play) (1842)
  - Bells and Pomegranates No. III: Dramatic Lyrics (1842)
    - Porphyria's Lover
    - Soliloquy of the Spanish Cloister
    - My Last Duchess
    - The Pied Piper of Hamelin
    - Count Gismond
    - Johannes Agricola in Meditation
  - Bells and Pomegranates No. IV: The Return of the Druses (play) (1843)
  - Bells and Pomegranates No. V: A Blot in the 'Scutcheon (play) (1843)
  - Bells and Pomegranates No. VI: Colombe's Birthday (play) (1844)
  - Bells and Pomegranates No. VII: Dramatic Romances and Lyrics (1845)
    - The Laboratory
    - How They Brought the Good News from Ghent to Aix
    - The Bishop Orders His Tomb at Saint Praxed's Church
    - The Lost Leader
    - Home Thoughts from Abroad
    - Meeting at Night
  - Bells and Pomegranates No. VIII: Luria and A Soul's Tragedy (plays) (1846)
- Christmas-Eve and Easter-Day (1850)
- Men and Women (1855)
  - Evelyn Hope
  - Love Among the Ruins
  - A Toccata of Galuppi's
  - Childe Roland to the Dark Tower Came
  - Fra Lippo Lippi
  - Andrea Del Sarto
  - The Patriot
  - The Last Ride Together(1855)
  - Memorabilia
  - Cleon
  - How It Strikes a Contemporary
  - The Statue and the Bust
  - A Grammarian's Funeral
  - An Epistle Containing the Strange Medical Experience of Karshish, the Arab Physician
  - Bishop Blougram's Apology
  - Master Hugues of Saxe-Gotha
  - By the Fire-side
  - My Star
- Dramatis Personae (1864)
  - Caliban upon Setebos
  - Rabbi Ben Ezra
  - Abt Vogler
  - Mr. Sludge, "The Medium"
  - Prospice
  - A Death in the Desert
- The Ring and the Book (1868–69)
- Balaustion's Adventure (1871)
- Prince Hohenstiel-Schwangau, Saviour of Society (1871)
- Fifine at the Fair (1872)
- Red Cotton Night-Cap Country, or, Turf and Towers (1873)
- Aristophanes' Apology (1875)
  - Thamuris Marching
- The Inn Album (1875)
- Pacchiarotto, and How He Worked in Distemper (1876)
  - Numpholeptos
- The Agamemnon of Aeschylus (1877)
- La Saisiaz and The Two Poets of Croisic (1878)
- Dramatic Idyls (1879)
- Dramatic Idyls: Second Series (1880)
  - Pan and Luna
- Jocoseria (1883)
- Ferishtah's Fancies (1884)
- Parleyings with Certain People of Importance in Their Day (1887)
- Asolando (1889)
  - Prologue
  - Summum Bonum
  - Bad Dreams III
  - Flute-Music, with an Accompaniment
  - Epilogue
