= Ivan Stang =

American writer (born 1953)

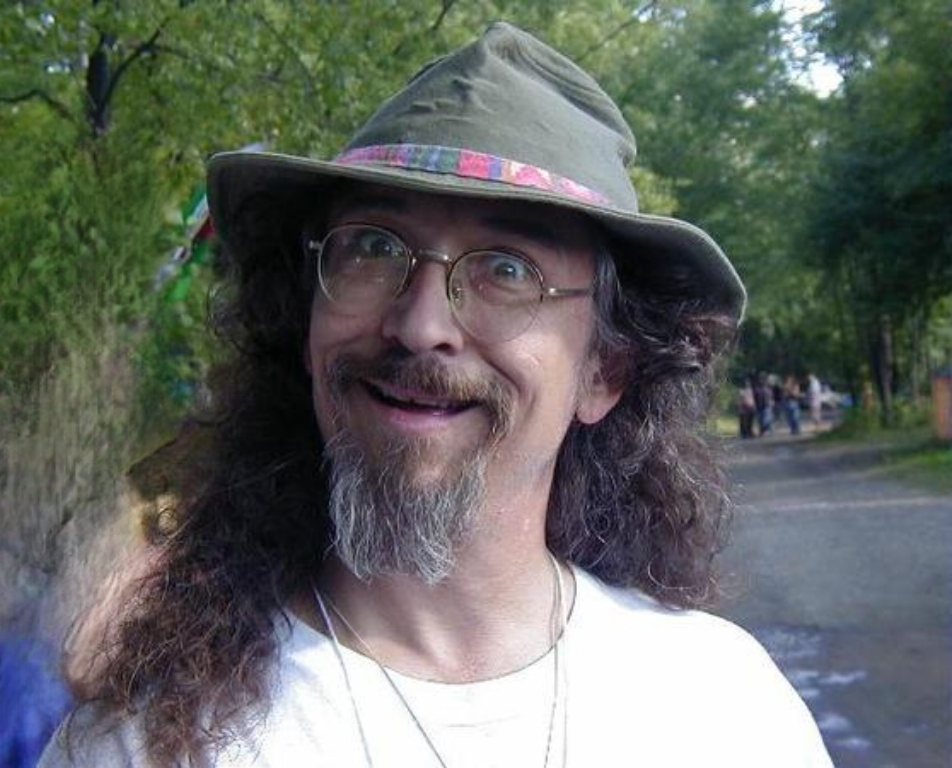
- Ivan Stang (2007)
- Born: Douglass St. Clair Smith; August 21, 1953 (age 72); Washington, D.C.
- Occupations: Writer, filmmaker, publisher
- Known for: Co-Founder of Church of the SubGenius

Ivan Stang (born Douglass St. Clair Smith; August 21, 1953) is an American writer, filmmaker and broadcaster, best known as the author and publisher of the first screed of the Church of the SubGenius. He is credited with founding the Church with friend Philo Drummond in 1979, though Stang himself denied this and claimed the organization was founded in 1953 by J. R. "Bob" Dobbs.

Born in Washington, D.C., and raised in Fort Worth, Texas, he attended the St. Mark's School of Texas. Since the publication of the first SubGenius pamphlet in 1980, Stang has embarked on a worldwide crusade (spanning at least three continents) to promote the Church. In May 2006 he finished writing, editing and designing a new SubGenius book for Thunder's Mouth Press, The SubGenius Psychlopaedia of Slack: The Bobliographon. He has appeared on several national radio and television shows, including The Jon Stewart Show on MTV. Stang is an instructor on the faculty of the Maybe Logic Academy. Both he and J.R. "Bob" Dobbs appear as characters in John Shirley's science fiction novel Kamus of Kadizar: The Black Hole of Carcosa.

== SubGenius Foundation ==
Stang also founded the business entity of the Church, the SubGenius Foundation. The SubGenius Foundation was located in Dallas, Texas, for most of its existence, though Stang relocated to Cleveland Heights, Ohio in 1999. The SubGenius Foundation was based there from 1999 to 2017, and the syndicated show The Hour of Slack is produced partially at WCSB at Cleveland State University. His "Rants" are a regular feature at the Starwood Festival and WinterStar Symposium, both produced by the Association for Consciousness Exploration (ACE). The Church has collaborated with ACE on a number of projects, including CDs, DVDs and the Rant 'n Rave events in Cleveland, Ohio. He was awarded Best Crack-Pot Preacher by the Cleveland Scene in 2000. Stang continues to promote the Church, and he is a prominent member of Cleveland's underground pop culture scene. In 2017 the Foundation and Stang moved to Glen Rose, Texas.

== High Weirdness by Mail ==
In 1988, Stang compiled a book called High Weirdness by Mail — A Directory of the Fringe: Crackpots, Kooks & True Visionaries. The book examined many non-mainstream or marginal cultural movements of the period, as well as providing contact information for those wishing to interact directly with people involved in these movements.

== Filmmaking ==
Stang is a filmmaker and an editor. In addition to creating several stop-motion short films with such titles as Reproduction Cycle Among Unicellular Life Forms Under the Rocks of Mars and Let's Visit the World of the Future, he also edited the 1989 feature-length VHS video spoof-documentary Arise! for the Church of the SubGenius, as well as providing narration and commentary for the 1999 documentary Grass. Commercial jobs have included a 60-second "Art Break" animated short for MTV, animation in a Devo music video, as well as writing and editing the feature-length documentaries China Run and The Cu-Chi Tunnels.

== Bibliography ==
- 1983 – The Book of the SubGenius (McGraw-Hill) ISBN 0-07-062229-9 / Reprinted 1987 (Simon & Schuster/Fireside) ISBN 0-671-63810-6
- 1988 – High Weirdness by Mail (Simon & Schuster/Fireside) ISBN 0-671-64260-X
- 1990 – Three-Fisted Tales of "Bob" (Simon & Schuster/Fireside) ISBN 0-671-67190-1
- 1994 – Revelation X: The "Bob" Apocryphon – Hidden Teachings and Deuterocanonical Texts of J. R. "Bob" Dobbs (Simon & Schuster/Fireside), with illustrations by St. Joe Riley et al., ISBN 0-671-77006-3
- 2006 – The SubGenius Psychlopaedia of Slack: The Bobliographon (Avalon/Thunder's Mouth Press), with illustrations by St. Joe Riley et al., ISBN 1-56025-939-6

== Discography ==
Partial discography includes:

- Starwood Slack! (recorded rant on cassette) (ACE)
- Invisible College Drop-Outs (recorded rant on cassette) (ACE)
- The Stupid Rant (recorded rant on cassette) (ACE)
- High Weirdness By Mail (recorded rant on cassette) (ACE)
- Rev. Stang Live at Starwood (recorded rant on CD + music) ISBN 1-59157-005-0 (ACE)
- I Was A Cultist For The A.T.F. (radio drama starring Stang)
- The Once and Future Legend (panel discussion on cassette with Ariana Lightningstorm, Patricia Monaghan, Jeff Rosenbaum, Robert Shea and Robert Anton Wilson) (ACE)
- What IS the Conspiracy, Anyway? (panel discussion on cassette with Anodea Judith, Jeff Rosenbaum, Robert Shea and Robert Anton Wilson) (ACE)

== Filmography ==
Partial filmography includes:

- 1969 – The Wad and the Worm (Director, writer, animator)
- 1973 – Let's Visit the World of the Future (Director, writer, & actor)
- 1978 – Reproduction Cycle Among Unicellular Life Forms Under the Rocks of Mars (Director, writer, & narrator)
- 1979 – Mono (Director & writer)
- 1987 – China Run (Video editor)
- 1989 – Arise!: The SubGenius Video (Island Records) (Director, writer, & appears as self)
- 1990 – The Cu Chi Tunnels (Video & script editor)
- 1992 – Arise!: The SubGenius Video (Polygram Records) ASIN 6302311616 (Director, writer, & appears as self)
- 1992 – Church of the Subgenius: Sect? Satire? Or Satanism? (Appears as self)
- 1999 – Grass (Narrator & does commentary)
- 2000 – Duelin' Firemen! (Actor)
- 2003 – Maybe Logic: The Lives and Ideas of Robert Anton Wilson (Appears as self)
- 2008 – God's Cartoonist: The Comic Crusade of Jack Chick (Appears as self)
- 2023 - "Time for the Show: The Movie" (Actor)

== See also ==
- St. Mark's School of Texas § Notable alumni
