= Free Party (UK) =

Defunct political party in England

J. R. "Bob" Dobbs, whose image was the party logo

The Free Party was a minor political party in the United Kingdom. They were founded to promote the free party scene during the 2001 general election. They stood candidates for the three Parliamentary seats within the city of Brighton and Hove, under names associated with the Church of the SubGenius. They proposed to select their policies from a wheel of fortune.

== Bob Dobbs ==
In the 1997 general election, a candidate stood for election in Brighton, Pavilion, using the description Church of the SubGenius, and the name of the "church" leader, J. R. "Bob" Dobbs. This was the election when the Labour Party was swept into power, winning all seats in Brighton and making Tony Blair prime minister. The Labour government introduced the Political Parties, Elections and Referendums Act 2000, legislation requiring the registration of political parties, and at the 2001 election, the Free Party was registered with the Electoral Commission, the registered party symbol chosen being an image of Dobbs' face.

At the 2001 election, the party stood candidates in all the Brighton constituencies, with Bob Dobbs achieving 1 per cent of the total votes in Brighton Pavilion, where they beat the UK Independence Party into seventh place. This was not enough, however, to secure the return of the candidates' £500 deposits.

After the 2001 election, the party failed to submit the required returns of electoral expenses, and the party was deregistered in March 2002.

At the following election, two candidates named Dobbs were again on the ballot, but without the party name their votes dropped dramatically.

== Elections contested by Free Party and allies ==
Date of election	Candidate name	Constituency	Party	Votes	%
1997 general election	Bob Dobbs	Brighton, Pavilion	Church of the SubGenius	125	0.3
2001 general election	Bob Dobbs	Brighton, Pavilion	Free Party	409	1.0
2001 general election	Dave Dobbs	Brighton, Kemptown	Free Party	227	0.6
2001 general election	Simon Dobbshead	Hove	Free Party	196	0.5
2005 general election	Gene Dobbs	Brighton, Kemptown	none	47	0.1
2005 general election	Bob Dobbs	Hove	none	95	0.2
