= Joe Riley (artist) =

American visual and plastic artist

- Born: Joseph Vergel Riley; February 26, 1964; Dallas, Texas, U.S.
- Died: September 27, 2007 (aged 43)
- Known for: Drawing, painting, graphic design, sculpture, special effects makeup, video

Joseph Vergel Riley (February 26, 1964 – September 27, 2007) was an American visual and plastic artist based in Dallas, Texas. A painter, sculptor, filmmaker, and special effects makeup artist, he made horror designs for latex masks and for films, such as the 2004 superhero film Blade: Trinity from Marvel Comics, as well as conceptual art for children's animated series, such as Nickelodeon's Jimmy Neutron: Boy Genius franchise from DNA Productions. He was also a notable part of the multimedia beginnings of the Church of the SubGenius as St. Joe Riley.

== Biography ==
=== Life ===
Joseph Vergel Riley was born on February 26, 1964, in Dallas County, Texas, U.S. His father was Rev. George Vergel Riley (alive as of 2009) and his mother Robbie Jean Riley (August 16, 1927 – June 1, 2006). Joe Riley went to a career development high school in Dallas, Skyline High School, majoring in commercial art, graduated in 1982, and followed at college with stage craft classes and the video department.

Riley became an illustrator and painter, a designer and filmmaker, a storyboard and background artist in animation, as well as a movie special effects and prosthetic makeup artist. He also made videos and audio collages, and sometimes comics. His defining career move was deciding to stay in Dallas: in a 2004 interview, he explained about not moving to Los Angeles, "I really wasn't interested in going to a large pond and being a small fish. I liked the medium to small pond that Dallas was. [...] I wasn't concerned about working on big titled films. [...] It was the work that was the thing... the craft."

Riley was also part of the beginnings of the Church of the SubGenius in Dallas (see Works section) and a friend of its co-founder Ivan Stang. On his blog, Riley reminisced in 2006 about how Stang once gave him a tape of cult "kook" Francis E. Dec recordings that he lent to a friend who played it at a 1993 party in Dallas where Forrest Jackson heard it, leading to Jackson videotaping in 1995 the only documented encounter with the reclusive Dec. About his involvement with the Church, Riley was quoted by the Church's online zine The Stark Fist of Removal as saying: "I'm not into SubGenius for the religious aspect so much. I see the Church more as... genetic stuntmen."

Joe Riley died of a sudden and unexpected heart attack on September 27, 2007, at age 43. He was survived by his wife, Penny Lee Harris Riley., and his 9-year-old son Mitch (Mitchell Ian Riley).

=== Works ===
Eulogized by his friend Rev. Ivan Stang, co-founder of the Church of the SubGenius, as "one of the funniest, coolest, most talented, most patient fellows I have ever had the pleasure to know and work with", Riley was involved with the beginnings of the Church as "St. Joe Riley": he worked on the syndicated program Hour of Slack and most of the early SubGenius videos, including the 1991 SubGenius commercial for MTV; he provided key illustrations for Stang's books Revelation X (1994) and The SubGenius Psychlopaedia of Slack: The Bobliographon (2006), as well as cards for INWO: SubGenius (1997, an official supplement to the Steve Jackson Games card game Illuminati: New World Order); he designed the official face of SubGenius mythos entity NHGH, and made the Church's rubber masks of Dobbs and NHGH (also used in the MTV ad).

Riley produced bizarre masks and designs for Funko or Death Studios, and prosthetic makeup or designs for gore or horror movies, such as the Marvel Comics vampire movie Blade: Trinity (2004, New Line Cinema) as painter. Riley also worked as conceptual artist on children's properties: he collaborated to the remake of Mighty Joe Young (1998, Disney/Buena Vista) as post-production coordinator, and made designs for the children's animation franchises of Dallas-based production company DNA Productions, such as the Jimmy Neutron: Boy Genius feature (2001, Paramount) and TV series (2004, Nickelodeon) as conceptual and storyboard artist, or The Ant Bully (2006, Warner Bros.) as digital effects and background artist.

From May 1996-February 1999, Riley produced and hosted a Dallas, Texas, cable access clip show called The Hypnotic Eye, collecting and showcasing obscure film material, animation, trailers, commercials, and behind the scenes footage from other local cable access shows and film screening interviews. The series ran 12 episodes.
