= Monarchist Party =

Monarchist Party may refer to:

- Monarchist Party of Bohemia, Moravia and Silesia, established 1990
- Monarchist Party of Russia, established 2012
- Monarchist National Party, Italian party established in 1946
- People's Monarchist Party (Portugal), established 1974
- People's Monarchist Party (Italy), established 1954
- Monarchist Party (University of Maryland), student government party

== See also ==
- Monarchism
- List of monarchist parties
