= High Weirdness by Mail =

Book by Ivan Stang

High Weirdness By Mail – A Directory of the Fringe: Crackpots, Kooks & True Visionaries
- Author: Ivan Stang
- Language: English
- Publisher: Fireside Books
- Publication date: 1988
- Pages: 333
- ISBN: 0-671-64260-X

High Weirdness By Mail – A Directory of the Fringe: Crackpots, Kooks & True Visionaries, by Ivan Stang (ISBN 0-671-64260-X) is a 1988 book dedicated to an examination of "weird culture" by actually putting the reader in touch with it by mail.

The book is divided into sections—"Weird Science," "UFO Contactees," "Drug Stuff," and others, and each section contains a variety of mini-articles describing organizations. Each organization article concludes with a mailing address (and in some cases, phone numbers), with many entries referencing publications and (in some case) merchandise that at the time of the book's publication could be requested free of charge or for the cost of postage.

Several years after the book's publication, Stang reported on the newsgroup alt.slack that his inclusion of entries for white supremacist groups in the book caused his name to be mentioned by those groups as a possible target for retaliation. (The book's commentaries on various hate groups were less than flattering.) Stang reported this incident to the FBI, but did not receive any actual harassment or threats from the groups in question.

The Association for Consciousness Exploration produced a follow-up lecture by Rev. Stang on cassette entitled High Weirdness by Mail, recorded live at the 1993 WinterStar Symposium.

Bob Black claims that his review of High Weirdness By Mail was the cause of his being sent a small 'prank' mail bomb.

== Updates ==
In 2008, to mark the 20th anniversary of the book's publication, the official Subgenius website posted "The Return of High Weirdness by Mail", an updated listing of many of the organizations featured in the original book that now had websites, combined with additional links for other websites that fit in the spirit of the book (see "External Links", below).

== Reception ==
A review in Reason praised the book as "a treasure trove of all that is over the edge of American mainstream culture."
