= The Saracen =

1989 novel by Robert Shea

The Saracen Land of the Infidel / The Holy War
- Author: Robert Shea
- Language: English
- Series: The Saracen
- Genre: Historical novel
- Publisher: Ballantine
- Publication date: April/March 1989
- Publication place: United States
- Media type: Print (Paperback)
- Pages: 468/357 pp (Paperback edition)
- ISBN: 0-345-33588-0
- OCLC: 19407905
- LC Class: CPB Box no. 1757 vol. 12
- Preceded by: All Things Are Lights

The Saracen is a two-part novel written by Robert Shea. The continuous tale has two separate portions: Land of the Infidel and The Holy War.

Basically ignored during its publication and then out of print although still enjoying strong reviews and a cult following by those who have read it, the novel is the portrayal of an English-born man, David, who is captured as a very young child and sold into slavery to Baibars, a Mamluk officer. He becomes a devout believer in Islam and takes the Arabic form of his name and the surname of a convert, Daoud ibn Abdullah. He develops into a gifted warrior and assassin. He is sent to the Papal Court in Orvieto in the 13th century as a spy, in order to foil an alliance between the Christian West and the Mongolian descendants of Genghis Khan to exterminate the Muslim faith and capture the Holy Land.

Daoud was also trained by the Hashishyya, a heretical Islamic order. One of the many spellings of its name, Hashshashin, is the origin the modern word "assassin". Shea spends considerable time discussing its techniques and philosophy, which are major themes of the book.

Many of the characters in the novel, such as Thomas Aquinas, Baibars, King Manfred of Sicily, Louis IX, and Charles of Anjou, are historical figures, who are woven into the fictional canvas Shea invented.

Some historians believe that an alliance was attempted by the Papal Court, with Louis IX's backing, with the Mongols against the Muslim world, which ultimately failed. Shea creates a fictional scenario to explain that failure, and his firmly historical figures, such as Aquinas, are set side by side with wholly fictional characters and semilegendary figures such as the Italian poet Sordello, who appears in Dante's Purgatorio and with whom Shea also takes considerable poetic license.

Other major fictional characters include Sophia, a Byzantine woman who is a member of Manfred's court and Manfred's former concubine and accompanies Daoud on his mission, and Simon de Gobingnon, a French knight assigned to protect the Mongol ambassadors, who is Daoud's chief nemesis and the son of the major characters in Shea's All Things Are Lights.

Daoud is unquestionably the hero of the novel, but those who have read All Things Are Lights and are familiar with Simon's background often find themselves sympathizing with the young Simon's attempts to live up to his birthright.

Ostensibly an adventure tale, the novel is also a thinly veiled look into secret societies such as the Hashishin and the Templar Knights. Shea tackled those subjects in many books, most famously his Illuminatus! Trilogy, co-written with Robert Anton Wilson. Many of Shea's books after Illuminatus!, such as Shike and All Things Are Lights, but deal with the secret societies that clearly had interested him. Few of his other books interweave his scholarly investigations of those societies into as compelling a story.
