= X-Day (Church of the SubGenius) =

Traditional part of the Church of the SubGenius

X-Day is a traditional part of the Church of the SubGenius, a religion formed as a parody of cults and extreme religious groups, and their pamphlets and claims. X-Day fell on July 5, 1998, the scheduled "end of the world", and has been celebrated on July 5 each year since then. From its inception in 1980, the Church had prophesied that an army of alien invaders (known as the "X-ists" or "Men From Planet X") would land on the planet Earth and destroy the world of "normals", "pinks", and "glorps," while the members of the Church of the SubGenius would be rescued by the aliens and taken away into space. Chapters 10 and 11 of Revelation X: The "Bob" Apocryphon supply additional details as to the precise kinds of fates which supposedly await the "pinks" and "normals" (as well as SubGenii who have not paid their membership fees) left behind when X-Day comes, saying, among other things, that those who are not immediately killed by the aliens will be enslaved by a society of evil clowns known as the "Bozo Cult" until eventually their souls are devoured by the Elder Gods. The book also tells readers that if they want more information, they should send one million dollars to Ivan Stang so that he can remake his 1973 film Let's Visit the World of the Future.

== First event ==
When July 5, 1998 arrived and no alien fleet appeared in the sky, members of the Church began citing a large number of conspiracy theories to explain why the predicted end of the world did not take place. The manual page of the ddate program claims that the Church "declared that it had got the year upside down" and that X-Day will actually take place in 8661. The most popular explanation for the failure of the prophecy in the Church is usually summarized with the statement, "the calendar is wrong and July 5th, 1998 has not really arrived yet." Because of this, the Church has held annual gatherings around July 5 of each year since 1998 to celebrate X-Day and greet the arrival of the anticipated alien "Sex Goddesses." No flying saucer rendezvous has been confirmed as of 2022, but members of the Church have been undaunted. A more recent theory suggests that the X-ists did indeed come to Earth on July 5, 1998 as foretold by "Bob," but through one of the most pervasive Conspiracy coverups, Earth and Mars were switched, and the "Earth" we know is actually Mars. And thus, as there was nobody on the True Earth at the time of their arrival, there was nobody there to witness the Rupture.

The X-Day celebration has become well known in underground culture circles, especially in pagan communities. Many underground rock bands have performed at X-Day, and the event has evolved into a festival similar to Burning Man, lasting for three to five days, with rock concerts, artistic events, bonfires, and parties taking place day and night. Of the various X-Day celebrations that have taken place, the largest and most popular each year was held at the Brushwood Folklore Center in Sherman, New York until 2011, when it was relocated to the Wisteria Event Campground in Pomeroy, Ohio. In 2021 it was announced that the "official" X-Day would be moved again to the Land of ID resort in Land o' Lakes, Florida.

== Event activities ==
Regular events at X-Day include a symbolic effigy burning of J.R. "Bob" Dobbs (the founder of the Church of the SubGenius); a baptism ("Bob"tism) where participants have their sins "washed away", "and receive new ones in return"; concerts and performances by underground rock bands and performance artists; theme camps; and an auction where participants are encouraged to donate strange, unusual, and offensive items of all sorts (including themselves).

"Burners" familiar with the Burning Man event have been upset by the fact that X-Day is not a commerce-free event in the fashion of Burning Man – the bands and participants at X-Day are, in fact, encouraged to sell their own items, music CDs and albums, and other paraphernalia. The Church of the SubGenius has responded to these complaints with the statement that it is not a non-profit church: "We're for-profit, we want profit, and we want to cast out false prophets." However, the Church's status as an independent corporation with no corporate affiliations has ensured that large, mainstream companies have avoided the X-Day celebration, allowing independent artists and underground performers to flourish. The Church claims to be the only religious organization that is "proud to pay its taxes".

== History ==
In 2007, the celebration notably coincided with Roswell, New Mexico's 60th anniversary celebration of a purported 'UFO incident'.

== See also ==
- The Eschaton
- Heaven's Gate, another UFO cult with a similar concept of "X-Day"
