= Robert Shea =

American novelist

- At the British National Theatre in 1977 for the opening of the nine-hour stage version of Illuminatus!
- Born: Robert Joseph Shea; February 14, 1933; New York City
- Died: March 10, 1994 (aged 61)
- Education: Manhattan College; Rutgers University
- Spouse(s): Yvonne Bremseth Shea, Patricia Monaghan
- Website: bobshea.net

Robert Joseph Shea (February 14, 1933 – March 10, 1994) was an American novelist and former journalist best known as co-author with Robert Anton Wilson of the science fantasy trilogy Illuminatus! It became a cult success and was later turned into a marathon-length stage show put on at the British National Theatre and elsewhere. In 1986 it won the Prometheus Hall of Fame Award. Shea went on to write several action novels based in exotic historical settings.

== Early life and education ==
Robert Joseph Shea was born in New York City. He attended high school at Manhattan Prep (Manhattan College High School), a Roman Catholic school run by the Christian Brothers, in the Riverdale section of The Bronx. After graduation, he attended Manhattan College and Rutgers University.

== Career and other works ==
Apart from co-authoring Illuminatus! with Wilson, Shea wrote several historical action novels, including Shike (1981), a two-volume novel set in Ancient Japan about the warrior monk Jebu and his love Lady Shima Taniko, All Things Are Lights (1986), and The Saracen, a novel published in two volumes in 1989 depicting the struggle between a blond Muslim warrior called Daoud ibn Abdullah and his French crusader adversary, Simon de Gobignon. His last published book was the Native American tale Shaman (1991).

All Things Are Lights and the outline for the unfinished novel Children of Earthmaker have been released under a Creative Commons license and are available to read and copy at Robert Shea's website, as are Shike, The Saracen, and Shaman under similar license terms. Lady Yang was finished but never published; a Creative Commons online version is in the works by Shea's son Michael.

Three of his lectures and two panel discussions he participated in were recorded when he was a featured speaker at both the Starwood Festival and the WinterStar Symposium (both with and without Robert Anton Wilson) and produced by the Association for Consciousness Exploration.

For several years, Shea edited the anarchist zine No Governor. The title comes from a quote attributed to Zhuangzi, "There is no governor anywhere." Copies of the zine in PDF format may be downloaded from Bobshea.net. The zine was mentioned in, and read by, one of the characters in Illuminatus!.

In 2025, Hilaritas Press issued Every Day Is a GOOD Day, a collection of short pieces by Shea, the first new Shea book in about 30 years.

== Personal life ==
Shea was a resident of Glencoe, Illinois He was survived by his son, Michael E. Shea, and his second wife, author Patricia Monaghan.

== Bibliography ==
=== Fiction ===
- The Illuminatus! Trilogy (with Robert Anton Wilson), omnibus edition printed December 1, 1983 by Dell: ISBN 0-440-53981-1, ISBN 978-0-440-53981-0
  - The Eye in the Pyramid (1975) Dell
  - The Golden Apple (1975) Dell
  - Leviathan (1975) ISBN Dell
- Shike (January 13, 1992) omnibus edition: Ballantine Books ISBN 978-0-345-36046-5
  - Time of the Dragons (June 1, 1981) Jove ISBN 978-0-515-04874-2
  - Last of the Zinja (July 1, 1981) Jove ISBN 978-0-515-05944-1
- All Things Are Lights (April 12, 1986) Ballantine Books ISBN 978-0-345-32903-5
- From No Man's Land to Plaza del Lago (October 1987) Amer References ISBN 0-913765-08-2, Available as a free download from Project Gutenberg. ISBN 978-0-913765-08-1
- The Saracen - available as free downloads from Project Gutenberg and
  - Land of the Infidel (February 13, 1989) Ballantine Books, ISBN 978-0-345-33588-3
  - The Holy War (March 13, 1989) Ballantine Books ISBN 978-0-345-35933-9
- Shaman (February 20, 1991) Ballantine Books ISBN 978-0-345-36048-9 - Available as a free download from Project Gutenberg

=== Nonfiction ===
- Every Day Is a GOOD Day: Robert Shea on Illuminatus! Writing and Anarchism, (Sept. 23, 2025) Hilaritas Press ISBN 978-1-952746-43-7

== Recorded lectures and panel discussions ==
- A Meeting With Robert Shea, ACE
- Writing and Mysticism, ACE
- Magic in the Central Empire, ACE
- The Once and Future Legend (panel discussion with Ariana Lightningstorm, Patricia Monaghan, Jeff Rosenbaum, Rev. Ivan Stang, and Robert Anton Wilson), ACE
- What IS the Conspiracy, Anyway? (Panel Discussion with Anodea Judith, Jeff Rosenbaum, Rev. Ivan Stang, and Robert Anton Wilson), ACE
