= Anodea Judith =

American author, therapist and public speaker

Anodea Judith (born Judith Ann Mull, December 1, 1952, Elyria, Ohio) is an American author, therapist, and public speaker on the chakra system, bodymind (body/mind integration), somatic therapy, and yoga. Judith is the author of Wheels of Life: A User's Guide to the Chakra System. She has maintained a private practice for over twenty years and presents workshops nationally and internationally at holistic retreat centers, yoga studios, Neo-Pagan and New Age events and training institutes. She is a past president of the Church of All Worlds (1986–1993), a founder of Lifeways, a school for the study of the healing and magical arts (1983), and a founding member of Forever Forests. She is on the faculty of Kripalu Center for Yoga and Health, and she is the founder and director of Sacred Centers, a teaching organization focusing on Chakra studies. She has a son named Alex, and one of her brothers is the late actor and singer-songwriter Martin Mull.

== Education and training ==
Judith's academic background includes a master's degree in clinical psychology from Rosebridge Graduate School of Integrative Therapy and a doctorate in Health and Human Services (focused on mind-body health) from Columbia Pacific University (an unaccredited, though state-certified, nontraditional distance learning school in California). Judith's studies in healing have included bioenergetics, psychology, psychotherapy, mythology, sociology, history, systems theory, and mystic spirituality. She is also an authority on chakras and yoga and somatic therapy. Her shamanic spiritual training led to ordination in 1985 through the Church of All Worlds, where she was a High Priestess for ten years.

== Awards ==
Judith's book Waking the Global Heart: Humanity's Rite of Passage from the Love of Power to the Power of Love was the winner of the 2007 Nautilus Book Award Best Book of the year for Social Change and of the 2007 Independent Publisher Award Silver Medal for Mind/ Body Spirit.

== Bibliography ==
- 1987 – Wheels of Life: a User's Guide to the Chakra System. Llewellyn Worldwide, ISBN 0-87542-320-5, ISBN 978-0-87542-320-3
- 1993 – The Sevenfold Journey: Reclaiming Mind, Body & Spirit Through the Chakras (with Selene Vega) Crossing Press, ISBN 0-89594-574-6, ISBN 978-0-89594-574-7
- 1996 – Eastern Body, Western Mind: Psychology and the Chakra System as a Path to the Self. Celestial Arts, ISBN 0-89087-815-3, ISBN 978-0-89087-815-6
- 2002 – The Truth About Chakras. Llewellyn Publications, ISBN 0-87542-362-0
- 2002 – The Truth About Neo-Paganism. Llewellyn Publications, ISBN 1-56718-567-3
- 2004 – Chakra Balancing Kit: A Guide to Healing and Awakening Your Energy Body. – Workbook and Cards, Sounds True, ISBN 1-59179-088-3
- 2006 – Contact: The Yoga of Relationship. (with Tara Lynda Guber) Insight Editions, ISBN 1-933784-02-4, ISBN 978-1-933784-02-1
- 2006 – Waking the Global Heart: Humanity's Rite of Passage from the Love of Power to the Power of Love. Elite Books, ISBN 0-9720028-9-8, ISBN 978-0-9720028-9-9
- 2012 – Creating on Purpose: The Spiritual Technology of Manifesting Through the Chakras. (with Lion Goodman) Sounds True, ISBN 1604078529, ISBN 978-1604078527

=== Audio ===
- The Chakra System: A Complete Course in Self-Diagnosis and Healing. – Six-tape audio course (Sounds True, 2000)
- The Beginner's Guide to the Chakras. (Sounds True; Abridged edition 2002) ISBN 1-56455-920-3, ISBN 978-1-56455-920-3
- The Gaia Conspiracy. (ACE)
- The Energetics of Magic. (ACE 1993)
- Wheels of Life: A Journey Through the Chakras. – With Rick Hamouris (Cassette) (ACE/Llewellyn Collection, 1987) ISBN 1-59157-001-8; also released by same publisher on CD in 1992 with ISBN 1-59157-000-X
- What IS the Conspiracy, Anyway?. – Panel discussion with Robert Anton Wilson, Robert Shea, Rev. Ivan Stang & Jeff Rosenbaum (ACE)

=== Video ===
- The Illuminated Chakras – A Visionary Voyage into Your Inner Worlds. (DVD) Sacred Centers 2004 ISBN 0-9742425-1-9, UPC 882157-930016
