= Sordello =

13th-c Italian troubadour

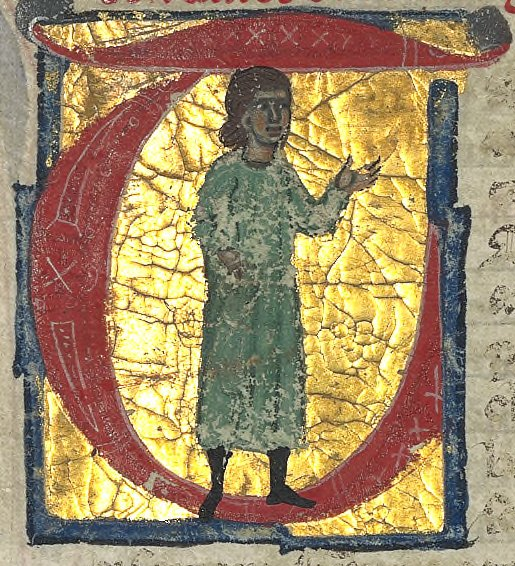
Sordello from a 13th-century manuscript

Sordello da Goito or Sordel de Goit (sometimes Sordell) was a 13th-century Italian troubadour. His life and work have inspired several authors including Dante Alighieri, Robert Browning, and Samuel Beckett.

== Life ==
Sordello was born in the municipality of Goito in the province of Mantua. About 1220 he was in a tavern brawl in Florence; and in 1226, while at the court of Richard of Bonifazio in Verona, he abducted his master's wife, Cunizza, at the instigation of her brother, Ezzelino III da Romano. The scandal resulted in his flight (1229) to Provence, where he seems to have remained for some time. He entered the service of Charles of Anjou, and probably accompanied him (1265) on his Naples expedition; in 1266 he was a prisoner in Naples. The last documentary mention of him is in 1269, and he is supposed to have died in Provence. His appearance in Dante Alighieri's Divine Comedy among the spirits of those who, though redeemed, were prevented from making a final confession and reconciliation by sudden death, suggests that he was murdered, although this may be Dante's own conjecture.

== Works ==
So far as we have authentic facts about his life, Sordello was the most famous of the Italian troubadours. His didactic poem L’ensenhamen d’onor, and his love songs and satirical pieces have little in common with Dante's presentation, but the invective against negligent princes which Dante puts into his mouth in the 7th canto of the Purgatorio is more adequately paralleled in his sirventes-planh (1237) on the death of his patron Blacatz, where he invites the princes of Christendom to feed on the heart of the hero.

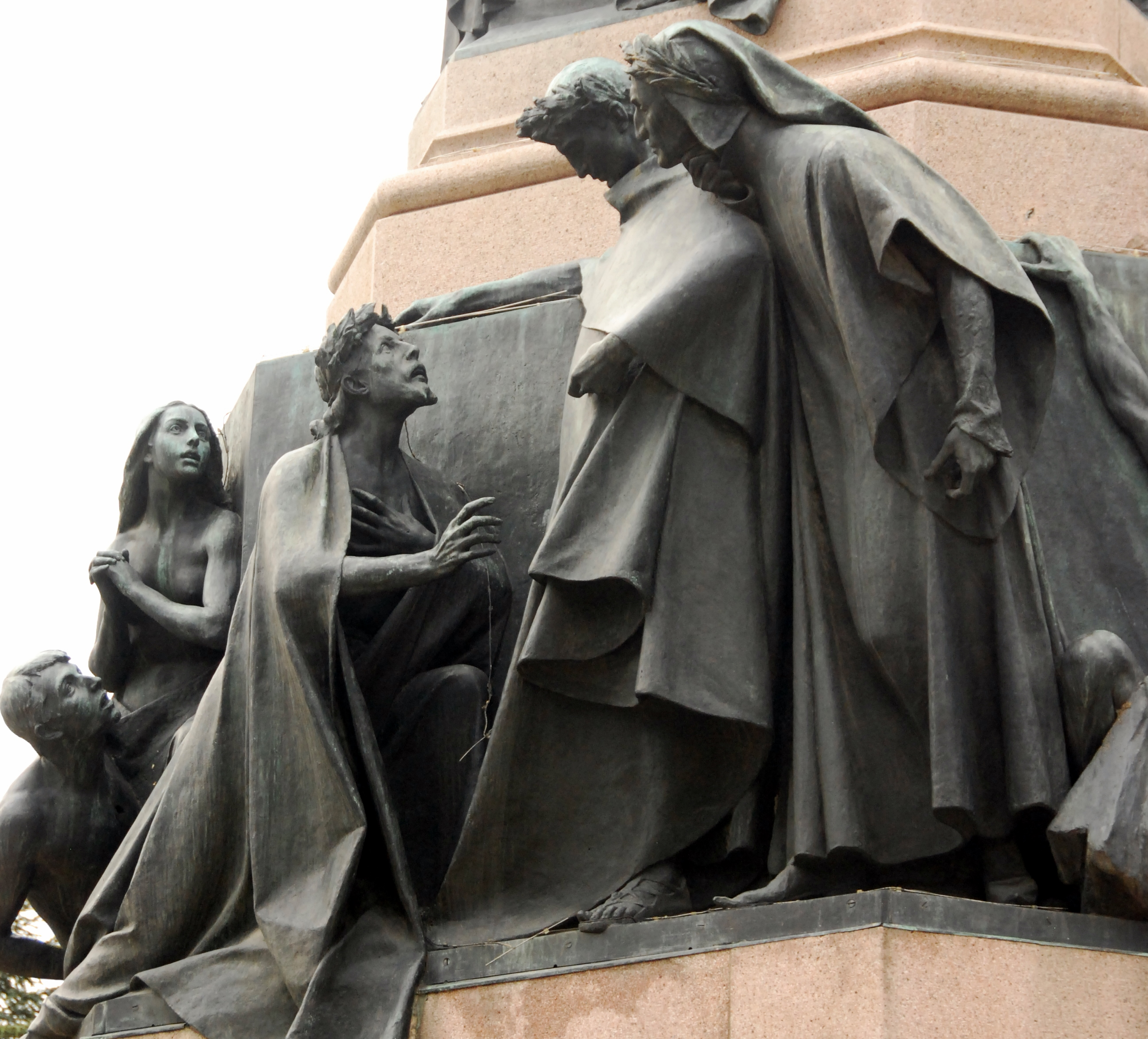
Dante and Virgil encounter Sordello in purgatory, part of the Monumento a Dante a Trento by Cesare Zocchi (1896).

== Legacy and reception ==
=== Medieval literature ===
Sordello was praised by Dante around 1305 in his treatise De vulgari eloquentia. He also appears as a character in the Divine Comedy, composed between 1308 and 1321, where he is featured in cantos 6, 7, and 8 of Purgatorio. The pilgrim meets Sordello among the souls who repented late in life or were violently murdered in Ante-Purgatory, which suggests that Dante thought that Sordello was murdered. When first approached by Dante and Virgil in Purgatorio 6, Sordello is clearly distinguished from other souls and stays silent. Sordello's first appearance is comparable to a lion eyeing the approaching travelers attentively. It is only when Virgil begs him for the best upward path that Sordello engages with the two poets and asks them about their city and life. Once Virgil mentions his city, Mantua, Sordello embraces him and expresses his excitement at hearing the sound of his city. Sordello thus shows that he regards himself as Virgil's neighbor and friend due to their common birthplace, and the love they both share for Mantua is enough to prompt their warm reaction to one another. Sordello continues to walk with the pair for three cantos. Dante uses Sordello's patriotism as a starting point for an aside that presents a breakdown of Italian politics to denounce Italy and its corrupted morals, violence, and lack of effective leadership (Purgatorio 6.76-151). In the narrative, Sordello also serves to teach Dante and Virgil about the workings of Ante-Purgatory, and he leads them out of it, until they all reach of the Valley of Rulers. Upon reaching the Valley of Rulers, Sordello points out the notable kings and princes surrounding the trio. Those mentioned are Rudolph I of Germany, Ottokar II of Bohemia, Philip III of France and Peter III of Aragon, among others.

=== Modern and contemporary literature ===
Sordello is also the hero of the well-known poem Sordello by Robert Browning, published in 1840. He is praised for his passion in Oscar Wilde's 1881 poem "Amor Intellectualis". Ezra Pound also references him in the Cantos.

Furthermore, Sordello is briefly referred to in Samuel Beckett's 1951 novels Molloy and Malone Dies. Numerous references to Sordello occur in Roberto Bolaño's 2000 novella By Night in Chile, and he is a principal character in Robert Shea's two-volume historical novel The Saracen, published in 1989.
