= Shike =

Shike may refer to:

- Shike (novel), a 1981 novel by Robert Shea
- Shike (Zen master), a Zen master rank
- Retainers in early China (social group), also known as shike
