= X-Day =

X-Day may refer to:

- Malcolm X Day, a holiday in honor of Malcolm X that is celebrated in May
- X-Day (Church of the SubGenius), a festival associated with the Church of the SubGenius
- X-Day (manga), a 2002 manga series by Setona Mizushiro
- X-Day, the first day of Operation Downfall, the planned Allied invasion of Japan during World War II
- X Day or Day X, the March 20, 2003 anti-war protest against the Iraq War
- X Day (musical), a 2010 musical by Akinori Nakagawa
- Yomei Kensaku Sābisu X-Day, a 1993 Namco arcade game
- X-Day (military terminology), synonym of D-Day (military term)
