= Discordian calendar =

Alternative calendar used by some adherents of Discordianism

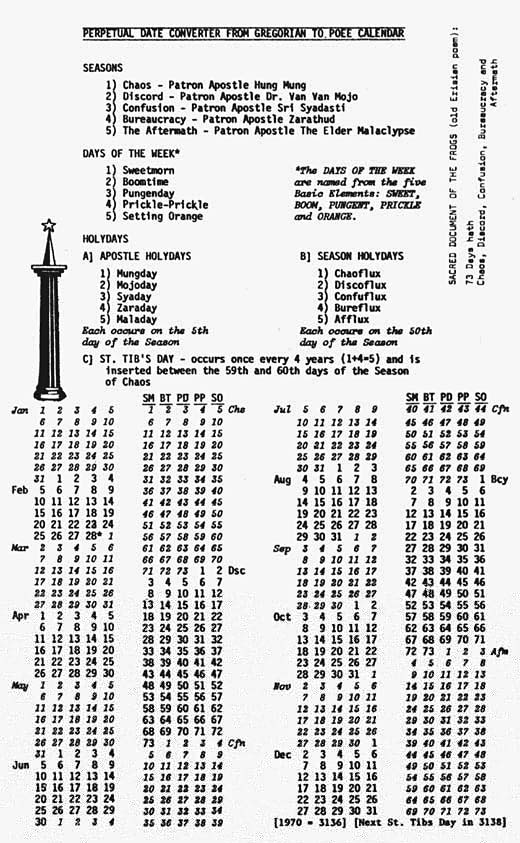
Discordian to Gregorian conversion calendar

The Discordian or Erisian calendar is an alternative calendar used by some adherents of Discordianism. It is specified on page 00034 of the Principia Discordia.

The Discordian year 1 YOLD is 1166 BC. (Elsewhere in the Principia Discordia, it is mentioned that the Curse of Greyface occurred in 1166 BC. As a reference, AD 2026 is 3192 YOLD, Year of Our Lady of Discord.) The abbreviation "YOLD" is not used in the Principia, though the phrase "Year of Our Lady of Discord" is mentioned once.

== Composition ==
As described in the Principia Discordia, the Discordian calendar has five 73-day seasons: Chaos, Discord, Confusion, Bureaucracy, and The Aftermath. The Discordian year is aligned with the Gregorian calendar and begins on January 1, thus Chaos 1, 3192 YOLD is January 1, 2026 Gregorian.

The Erisian week consists of five days: Sweetmorn, Boomtime, Pungenday, Prickle-Prickle, and Setting Orange. The days of the week are named after the five basic Discordian elements: Sweet, Boom, Pungent, Prickle, and Orange. There are 73 of these weeks per year and every year begins with Sweetmorn.

Every fourth year in the Discordian calendar, starting in 2 YOLD, an extra day is inserted between Chaos 59 and Chaos 60 called St. Tib's Day. This is because 4 years + 1 day = 5, a holy number, but the Discordian leap year also coincides with the Gregorian one. The result of this is that any given day of the year in the Discordian calendar may be taken to correspond to the same day of the year in the Gregorian calendar, and vice versa, although some users of the calendar believe that it is tied to the Julian calendar and so will diverge from the Gregorian in 3266 YOLD (AD 2100). St. Tib's Day is considered outside the Discordian week.

There are Apostle Holydays on the 5th day of each season, named after the 5 Discordian apostles: Mungday, for Hung Mung; Mojoday, for Dr. Van Van Mojo; Syaday, for Sri Syadasti; Zaraday, for Zarathud; and Maladay, for Malaclypse the Elder. There are also Season Holydays on the 50th of each season: Chaoflux, Discoflux, Confuflux, Bureflux, and Afflux.

Holyday	Discordian calendar	Gregorian calendar
Mungday	Chaos 5	January 5
Chaoflux	Chaos 50	February 19
St. Tib's Day	St. Tib's Day	February 29
Mojoday	Discord 5	March 19
Discoflux	Discord 50	May 3
Syaday	Confusion 5	May 31
Confuflux	Confusion 50	July 15
Zaraday	Bureaucracy 5	August 12
Bureflux	Bureaucracy 50	September 26
Maladay	The Aftermath 5	October 24
Afflux	The Aftermath 50	December 8

Only these eleven dates are named in the Principia Discordia; however, Discordians have felt free to invent other holidays which have become popular to varying degrees. Some of these include Discordians for Jesus/Love Your Neighbor Day (March 25/Discord 11); Jake Day (April 6/Discord 23 or occasionally May 23/Discord 70), a day to send tongue-in-cheek letters, emails or faxes to an official or bureaucracy; Saint Camping's Day (May 21/Discord 68), a day to make End of Days predictions and share them in social media; Eris Day (May 23/Discord 70), a day to gather and celebrate Goddess; Towel Day (May 25/Discord 72); Mid Year's Day (July 2/Confusion 37); X-Day (July 5/Confusion 40); and Multiversal Underwear Day (August 10/Bureaucracy 3).

== Implementations ==
ddate is a program that prints the current date in the Discordian calendar. It was a part of the util-linux package containing basic system utilities. As such, it had been included at least since 1994 in nearly all Linux distributions. In August 2011 however, one of the maintainers of util-linux made ddate optional, and by default omitted. In October 2012, ddate was completely removed from util-linux. The ddate program now has an upstream source. There was some controversy, but in the end, anyone wishing to reintroduce ddate to a distribution will have to create a separate package based on the new upstream. This has been done for Debian, FreeBSD, Fedora Linux, and Gentoo Linux for example.

There are many other programs with similar functionality, such as Hodge Podge, an Android widget. Discordian-calendar is an implementation using Java 8's date and time classes.
