= Marshall Ledbetter =

American known for a strange protest (1969–2003)

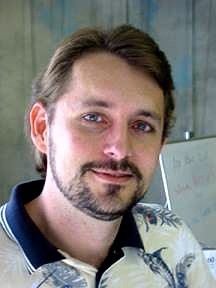
- Marshall Ledbetter circa 2001
- Born: Marshall Ledbetter, Jr. June 10, 1969
- Died: July 14, 2003 (aged 34)
- Known for: protest

Marshall Ledbetter, Jr. (June 10, 1969 – July 14, 2003) was an American photographer, psychedelics enthusiast, iconoclast, and unconventional protester.

== Protest ==
In the early morning of June 14, 1991, Ledbetter, then a student at Florida State University, broke into the Florida State Capitol building and phoned a number of odd demands from the office of Wayne Todd, the Sergeant At Arms of the Florida Senate. This triggered a police standoff (the police were not sure whether Ledbetter was armed or if he might have a hostage) that eventually ended peacefully. One recounting of the events stated:

One night in 1991, Ledbetter broke a window and walked unopposed into the state capitol building in Tallahassee, Florida. Once inside, the 22-year-old Ledbetter blockaded himself into an administrative office wing and called the police, demanding that society wake up and stop being automaton clones of one another and making all sorts of crazy demands of the State Police.

He told them that he wanted (among other things) a large Gumby's pizza, a case of beer and $100 worth of Chinese food. The demand note was not sent directly to the police but was faxed to the song request fax line of Gulf 104, a local rock station. The police surrounded the capitol building and set up SWAT teams and snipers throughout the area, while Marshall Ledbetter demanded that the police get the following people on the telephone so that he could talk to them: Timothy Leary, Jello Biafra, Ice Cube and Lemmy Kilmister.

...[T]he standoff lasted several hours until a Capitol Television reporter named Mike Vasilinda talked Ledbetter out of the office by reading his list of demands over the closed circuit television system in the Capitol. Within minutes of the fake broadcast, Ledbetter opened the door and crawled out as police subdued him. He was arrested on B&E charges.

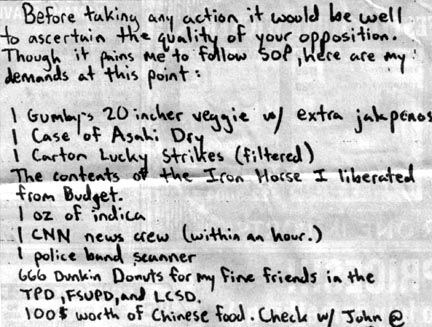
The demands note from Marshall Ledbetter

Wayne Todd remembered the event this way:

"I was at a fishing tournament and got a call saying there was a hostage situation in my office", said Todd. "The maid had come in around 7:30 in the morning and he threw a liquor bottle at her."
As the SWAT team took Ledbetter out of the building, Todd said, "I told Larry Campbell [Leon County Sheriff] to get that liquor bottle out of his hand before the press got in to see us."

Of the many apocryphal stories surrounding Ledbetter's standoff, perhaps none is more famous than the request for donuts contained in his demand note. While it was widely reported that Ledbetter had asked for "666 jelly donuts", a read of his actual demand note clearly shows he was ordering donuts from Dunkin' Donuts for the police: "666 Dunkin' Donuts for my fine friends in the TPD (Tallahassee Police Department), FSUPD (Florida State University Police Department) and the LCSD (Leon County Sheriff's Department)."

After the standoff, Marshall was taken to the Florida State Hospital at Chattahoochee where he was eventually forced by court order to accept anti-psychotic drug treatment. On the Florida State campus that fall (especially among the members of student government party the Monarchy Party), Marshall became something of a folk hero, with a few souls wearing homemade "Free Marshall Ledbetter Now" T-shirts (although an account from one FSU alumna states that they were really FMLN shirts and buttons borrowed from a local left-wing group supporting El Salvador's Frente Farabundo Martí para la Liberación Nacional). Marshall unsuccessfully attempted to escape from Chattahoochee that fall.

== Personal life ==
Marshall grew up in Auburndale, Florida. He was an avid photographer and worked at his father's camera store, Marshall's Camera. He always seemed to have a camera and generously shared his photos. He was an enthusiast of the Church of the SubGenius. He had one daughter.

Ledbetter died by suicide in 2003.

== Influence on pop culture ==
Jello Biafra penned "The Ballad of Marshall Ledbetter" for his band Lard (the song was released in 2000). While Biafra never met Ledbetter, he said "I have spoken with him. He was lucky to get out of there alive. If it had happened now, I’m sure they would have just gone in there and blown the place up, or just done it Waco-style. He was institutionalized, and now he's back out again walking the straight and narrow. But he sends me some odd anecdotes in the mail now and then. He was somebody who had had enough of the injustice in our world and chose to do something about it in very colorful fashion. I’ve been a long time fan of creative crime. The best part about this one is, it made a statement, it was a work of art, and not a single person got hurt."
