= Alt.binaries.slack =

Usenet newsgroup

alt.binaries.slack is a Usenet newsgroup created for the purpose of posting pictures, sounds, and utilities related to the Church of the SubGenius, making them available for everyone to see and hear. Because the Church of the SubGenius is well known for encouraging somewhat distasteful humor, the newsgroup is also home to artists who post humorous artwork of all sorts (including some pieces that may be considered offensive). A fair amount of the pictures on alt.binaries.slack are adult-oriented, and may be considered upsetting by some viewers. The denizens of the newsgroup state that they enjoy deliberately offending those who are too easily offended.

In spite of the crude nature of some of the pictures and sounds posted to the newsgroup, many of its regular contributors have displayed considerable talent. Computer graphics artists often visit alt.binaries.slack to show off their latest experimental works, along with underground musicians who want to expose their music to a "unique" audience.

The clip art image of J.R. "Bob" Dobbs, the founder of the Church of the SubGenius, is commonly seen on alt.binaries.slack, where he appears regularly in images by many artists. Proper etiquette on the newsgroup dictates that credit be given where it is due, and acknowledgment of the ownership of "Bob's" image by the Church is accepted by the regular newsgroup participants.

Shortly after its creation, via forged Usenet control messages in 1995, the newsgroup was targeted by warez traders, who tried to use it for the distribution of pirated commercial software. The users of the newsgroup responded by forming their own internal "police force" for the newsgroup, known as the SubGenius Police, Usenet Tactical Unit - Mobile (SPUTUM). This group of Internet-savvy people embarked on a successful campaign to drive the warez traders out of the newsgroup. They then turned their resources and skills towards the ongoing problem of spam on the Internet. As a result, the users of alt.binaries.slack pride themselves on having one of the most spam-free binaries newsgroups on Usenet.

A protracted 1997 flame war erupted between newsgroup users and Mike Enlow, the self-proclaimed "world's most-respected information broker/technology marketing consultant", who spammed the newsgroups with an advertisement that included a picture of himself. ABS regulars began digitally manipulating the photo in various means and setting up webpages of their "Enlow Art". Before long dozens of mirror websites were set up on servers around the world. The length and hostility of the flame war led some ABS regulars to question how far "parodying" should go.
