= Monarchy Party =

Student political party in Maryland and Florida

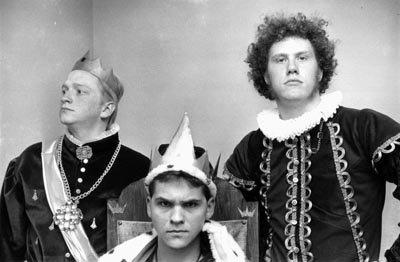
Left to right: Jason T. Shipp, Jon Lammers, Andrew Arvesen. January 26, 1990

The Monarchy Party was a student political party that formed independently on two campuses across the United States. The first group was formed around 1970 at the University of Maryland, College Park by Greg Canter (also known as Sir Barchan of Dinglebury). The second was formed, without knowledge of the first, on the campus of Florida State University in Tallahassee, Florida in 1989. The latter incarnation received media attention in The Washington Post and The Times of London, and was confronted by other student leaders who would later go on to conventional political careers, such as Trey Traviesa who represented District 56 in the Florida House of Representatives. At one point, Florida State University quarterback and eventual Heisman Trophy winner Charlie Ward ran successfully as their vice presidential candidate. There appears to have been a third student Monarchy Party formed in 1997 on the campus of San Francisco State University, but it is unclear how successful they were. The parties received a political endorsement by Mojo Nixon, and would later be mentioned in a song called the "Ballad of Marshall Ledbetter" by former Dead Kennedys singer, Jello Biafra.

The basis of both of these political groups was to get a Monarch elected student body president. In a strange occurrence of synchronicity both groups used the campaign slogan "Vote once for the King, and you'll never have to vote again".

== Florida State University Monarchy Party ==
The group at Florida State University was formed late one night in January, 1989, in the TV lounge of Landis Hall (which is the dormitory for honors students at FSU) by Andrew Arvesen, Chuck Powell, and Jon Lammers. The original idea was to protest the dominance of the "Greek" fraternity/sorority system in student government, which they felt led to cronyism and misallocation of student activity fees. To do this, though, they had to register a political party that would be entitled to participate in the election debates. Briefly, they considered names such as the Erection Party, with slogans such as "We're hard to beat" or "We'll stay up all night for you." But it seemed much more apt to mock the current state of affairs, with the Greek organizations treating student government as its own personal fiefdom. "They might as well be hereditary monarchs," said Arvesen. That was it. A party was born.

While they knew they were basing their party on a joke, they were not having a joke party. Instead, they employed humor to serious political ends. As FSU Monarchy Party Crown Prince, Jason Shipp, once accused his opponent: ". . . You are a true master of politics, from poly meaning many, and ticks meaning bloodsuckers."

Since the opposing student parties at FSU (Seminole Party and Action Party) were better funded, the Monarchists used alternative campaigning techniques. They wore bright colored renaissance and medieval outfits, often borrowed from the local chapter of the Society for Creative Anachronism, they wore swords, and had their displays around campus set up with working stocks and a functioning guillotine (used to chop cabbage and watermelons in the student union). These props were made by Gregory Cohen, the behind the scenes guy in the party. His hobby seems to have been taking wild ideas from other members of the group and making them into reality.

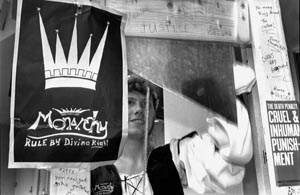
Andrew Arvesen and the Monarchy Party guillotine. September 27, 1989

The Monarchy Party grew to be one of the largest student groups on the campus of FSU, holding coronations with an attendance of over 800 students. Many formerly uninvolved students became politically active due to the Monarchists, as is shown by the fact that elections in which they participated drew record voter turnouts. In a single format, spectacle, wonder, and politics were combined into a synergistic moment with the Monarchy Party. As one observer at the time put it, "Other parties have supporters, but the Monarchy Party has a fan club."

In order to operate as a student organization between elections, the group also incorporated itself as the Young Monarchist's League. Some members took an active interest in researching current and historical monarchies, enabling the group to add authentic features to their public events and ceremonies, such as coronations, investitures, and the like. Such ceremonies were always accompanied by a large party, with live music and entertainment. However, the high point of the event was when the monarch held court, a performance that combined medieval costuming, satirical humor, and the random ennoblement of audience members. These events attracted hundreds of students. As one of their posters stated, "A political party is still a party."

The party itself while symbolized with the trappings of a monarchy took a separate route in the minds of the Students of FSU, to the point that on its own, the pronunciation of Monarchy (as in the party) shifted its emphasis from its first syllable to its second, changing its pronunciation to sound more like Malarky. While not planned, this seemed somewhat appropriate and approved of by the party's organizers.

The Monarchy Party as it grew became a victim of its own success. Monarchy candidates finally won the student body presidential election, putting Jeannie Belin and Charlie Ward into office. By this time the trappings of office, the costumes, the humor and the royal titles were long gone, so was the newspaper and the mottoes. People's pronunciation of Monarchy returned to the way it was. Andrew Arvesen once said that the "Monarchy Party will get stronger with defeat". Unfortunately, it was victory that killed it.

=== Marshall Ledbetter ===
Marshall Ledbetter, a fringe member of the Monarchy Party, took over the Florida State Capitol with nothing more than an empty bottle of grain alcohol and his wit. In his demands fax he requested the demands be delivered by, among others, "A ranking member of the Monarchy Party". Marshall was a former roommate of Jon Lammers (King Jon), and started his trek to the capitol building from Steven Profit's (Prince Steven) apartment behind Bill's Bookstore, the independent FSU campus book store, where he was crashing at the time.

=== The King's English and Crown Dispatch ===
Rolling Throne Magazine

The Monarchy Party published a newsprint newsletter that was distributed free on the campus of Florida State University. Each copy of this publication, called the Kings English and Crown Dispatch, was a layout parody of a major mass media publication. These lampoons included Pravda, The New York Times, USA Today, Cosmopolitan, U.S. News & World Report, and Rolling Stone. The Rolling Stone parody was an exception as it was titled "Rolling Throne." Containing "All the news that fits the Prince," approximately 10,000 copies of each paper were distributed to the "citizens of the Kingdom of Florida State." The goal was to get votes for the party using a clever blend of humor and information. The idea was that if it were entertaining to read, the paper would reach a larger audience and persuade more readers to see the royalist point of view.

In addition to covering campus politics with wry humor, The Kings English also covered royal news worldwide, with an emphasis on the governmental and historical aspects, rather than the fashion focus of mainstream royalty magazines.

To the surprise of its creators, The Kings English was shipped around the world by students to family members. Some ended up in the Middle East with soldiers taking part in Operation Desert Storm. These people in turn were so amused that they sent donations to the Monarchy Party to help its continued publication.

To encourage distribution, the creators encouraged photocopying of the publication. This has been upgraded to the Creative Commons license as it became available years later. The Kings English was primarily written by Travis Casey, Bucky Goldstein, Andrew Arvesen, and Gregory Cohen.

The best of the Monarchy Party's print work is compiled in a book called the Monarchists Cookbook.

=== Royal Family ===
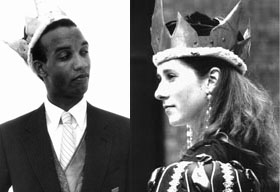
King Charles (Chuck Powell- Left) (1991) and Queen Sarah (Sarah Poore -Right) 1992

During its life, the kingdom had several Kings and Queens. With the exception of the title of Knight, titles often stayed around for the members time with the party, on the theory that "Once a King, always a King, but once a knight is enough."

- Andrew Arveson - King Andrew and later after stepping down Archduke Andrew
- Steven Profit - Prince Steven the Provocative and Pure, earlier Count Chocula of Biscuitmania.
- Jon Lammers - King Jon
- Chuck Powell - Prince Charles, then Prince Charming, later King Charles
- Jason Shipp - Prince Jason
- Sarah Poore - Queen Sarah, earlier Sarah the Just and Perfectly Proportioned
- Rogue - The last real candidate for the Monarchy Party, shortly before he founded the band The Crüxshadows.

=== Fund Raising ===
The Monarchy Party at FSU may have been the first party since the times of Boss Tweed to turn a profit on an election. They did this not only by openly soliciting donations from real monarchs, which they did get, but by selling T-shirts and big floppy hats with a feather in them in the student union. This fund raising raised money to produce the Kings English and Crown Dispatch. There were a few dark times for fund raising where Jason Shipp had to use his credit card to buy things for folks who gave him cash to pay for the paper.

=== Monarchy Party slogans ===
A monarchy party poster from about 1990.

The Monarchy Party had a wide selection of slogans that they emblazoned on posters and other signs. Some were specific to locations. Banners spray-painted onto sheets were hung from the girls-only dormitories that said "The King Slept Here". Some were as simple as a sign that said "Bribes" that was hung above a table filled with donuts on the day of the election. When campus workers dug a trench to bury pipes behind the library, the Monarchists hung a sign that read "Moat Construction Project Brought to You by the King." When opponents tried to remove the sign, workers prevented them from doing so.

The group produced dozens of flyers that combined catchy slogans with appropriate historical engravings of monarchs, torture, and jousting. These flyers were extremely popular on campus and many students collected them, putting up Monarchy "shrines" in their dorm rooms. All of which fed the enthusiasm for the party.

- "Competence is the crutch of the unqualified"
- "Vote once for the king, and you'll never have to vote again"
- "99% the power and 1/10 the responsibility"
- "Tacete et Parete" ("Shut Up and Obey")
- "There is no confidence like the divine right"
- "We put the class back in the ruling class"
- "A Political Party is Still a Party"
- "Voice your Apathy! Vote Monarchy"
- "We're Looking for a few Elite Nobles."
- "Don't think of it as gaining a king, think of it as losing a president"
- "Monarchy is Love"
- "Monarchy, Rule by Divine Right"
- "Don't Get Caught on the Wrong End of a Pillaging Horde!"
- "A Pheasant for every Peasant"
- "Women's Liberation" (This slogan was illustrated by the Coronation Portrait of Queen Elizabeth II.)

=== Monarchy Party Platform ===
The party produced an election platform that was about a third satirical jabs at the campus establishment, a third royalist history jokes, and a third serious proposals. Many voters had trouble sorting out which items were which. However, it is strange to see how many of the more outlandish platform planks have been implemented in succeeding years by the school administration, most notably woodchipping Woodward Avenue, a major thoroughfare that dangerously cut through the middle of campus, the installation of a snack bar/cafe in the library, and the current administrative pursuit of the Greek Relocation Program (the majority of FSU's Greek organizations are now in an area called Heritage Grove which is over a mile away from campus). A few of the Monarchy Party Platform's greatest hits:

- "We will annex Poland."
- "Expand the FSU bookstore so that it carries more books than sweatshirts."
- (Another election) "Change the Union Bookstore's name to the Union Gift Shop"
- "Protection for all whales on campus."
- "Authorize privateers to raid and loot other campuses to augment student government budget."
- "Cross-campus ski lift to be paid for by new FSU lottery."
- (Another election) "Construct a subway on campus to connect with the new University Center."
- "Provide more free phones in the Student Union." (Not humorous, but one which they actually accomplished before gaining power.)
- "Offset future tuition hikes by seeking corporate sponsors."
- "Campus police must patrol on horseback and become proficient in the use of the lance or mace."
- "Greek Relocation Program: Move all Greek houses to one area farther from campus. Panhellenic events will be easier to organize, beer trucks can make one-stop delivery, and new areas for parking will be opened up close to campus."

== University of Maryland Monarchist Party ==
The University of Maryland's political group referred to itself as the Monarchist Party. It had the same goals as FSU's party, but it started much earlier. The actual organization date is uncertain, but some sources put it starting as far back as 1969 or possibly 1972. This seems to be the start date of the Markland Medieval Mercenary Militia and there is some evidence that Monarchist Party split from the Militia to make sure it would continue to get funded by the Student Government Association. It was not until 1985 that they got elected, and at that point they won the top slot by taking the Student Body Presidency. This first elected student king was King Tom II, AKA Tom Cooper, who later served in USMC during the Gulf War and then as a Maryland State Trooper ("Super-duper Trooper Cooper"). Also serving in the first court were Queen Virginia, Lord High Chancellor Duke Sir Paul, and Chancellor of Exchequer Prince Jim.

=== Campaign ===
King Tom II's campaign was based around a beer moat. Mr. Cooper promised to order construction of a "Security moat" circling the campus and filled with 'cold lager.' A popular campaign slogan was "Moat Vonarchist". He also decreed that any thermonuclear devices "fully designed, assembled and tested" on the Maryland campus should be heavily taxed. When questioned about his opinion on campus environmental group, MaryPIRG, the King answered that he "used to date her sister".

Another popular campaign slogan was "Both the SGA (Student Government Association) and the Monarchist Party are jokes. But one of them isn't funny." This was in reference to alleged corruption of previous Student Body Governments, which has never been proven one way or the other.

The Monarchist Party's main opposition was a group backed by the fraternities. The opposing group spent their entire campaign allocation of $1500.00 on posters, buttons, "Get out the vote" shuttle buses, etc. King Tom was said to have spent approximately $4.97 one afternoon on video games at the Student Union arcade, and a submarine sandwich for lunch. Another source of revenue was an enclosed wall display with a paper troth between the sliding glass doors into a Dixie cup. behind the cup was a drawing of King Tom as a M-16 carrying soldier with a smiley face yelling "Kill, Kill, Kill". All of the Monarchist Party campaign material was made by those running for office, and their supporters.

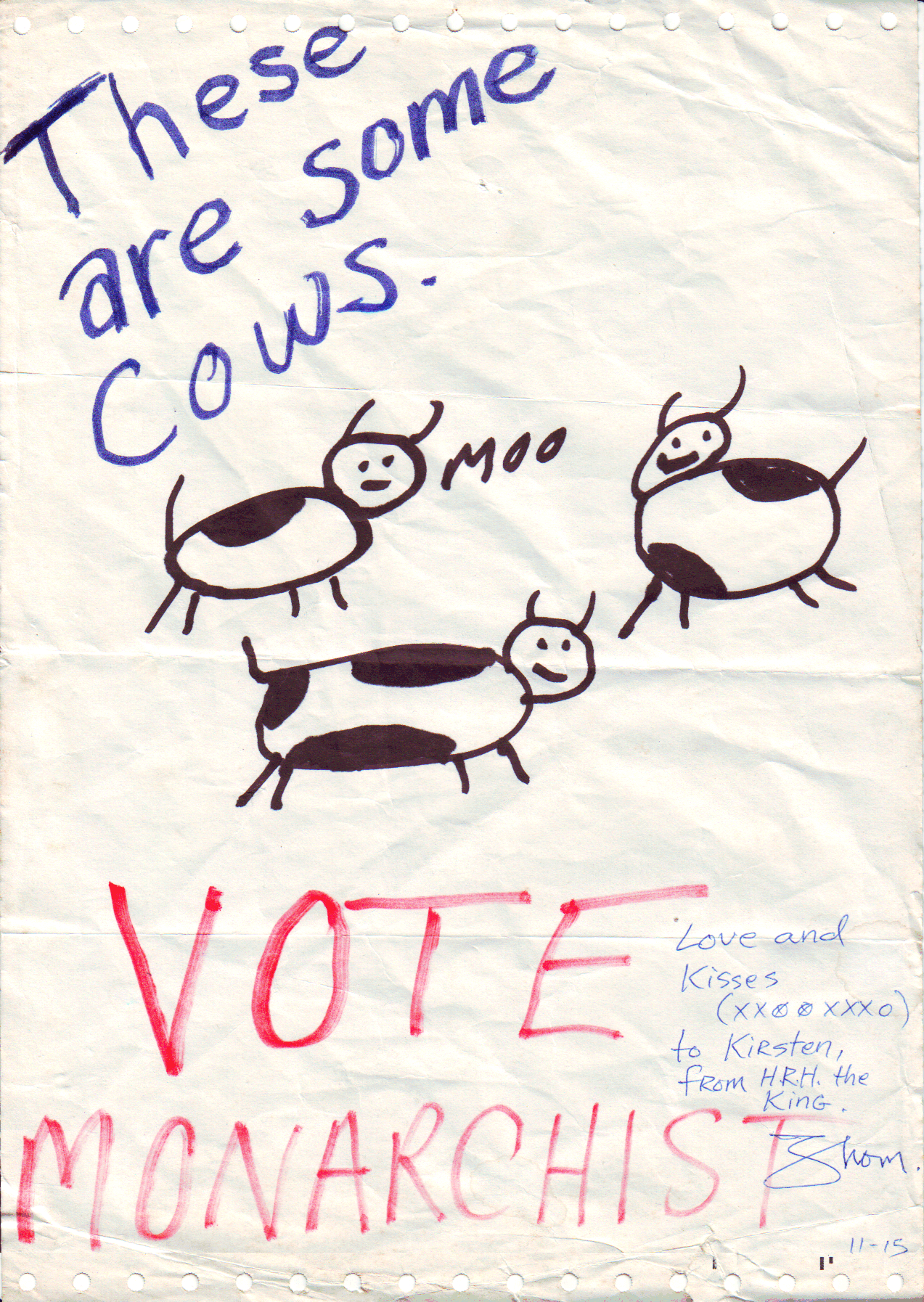
A campaign poster from the 1985 campaign of Monarchist Party candidate King Tom. "These are some cows. Vote Monarchist." Signed by "HRH The King Thom."

As time went on during the campaign, it became clear that the Monarchist Party was mustering more support than they ever had in past years. In order to keep the support building, a new slogan and poster was devised. It showed three crudely drawn cows and was handwritten in magic marker "This is the year, this is the beer, here are some cows". This new slogan was thought up by King Tom's friend, Timothy Smith.

=== Election ===
King Tom II carried out his first campaign promise as soon as he was elected. He demanded a re-count. The re-count was denied by the administration of U-Md. A local reporter interviewing King Tom suggested the Monarchists had made a mockery of the election, to which King Tom replied "It's pronounced 'Monarchy.'" As his victory was proclaimed, King Tom was held aloft in a chair on the balcony of the side lobby of the Student Union to the chants of "Beer! Moats! Monarchy!". King Tom would later be received at court by King Olav V of Norway.

=== Re-election ===
A year later, King Tom II, became the first person to ever be re-elected as head of the University of Maryland SGA. One of the people he defeated was Jim Risner. Having run an even cheaper campaign than the Monarchist Party, Jim was brought on board and dubbed Sir James of Parking Lot 4.

=== King James ===
In 1988 Jim Risner became the next king to be elected and was crowned King James I. The main rallying cry for this election was 'Vote Moat or Implode'. In addition to keeping true to the longstanding Monarchist Party platform plank of constructing a beer filled moat King James attempted to get jousting performed during halftime at the Maryland Terrapin football games. He defined much of the college monarchist movement when he was quoted as saying: We figure college should be fun, It's possible to be competent and fun, and that's what we're doing. He never actually said this but he never contradicted it either.
