= Cristina Eisenberg =

American ecologist

Cristina Eisenberg is an American ecologist. She builds government-to-government partnerships between federal agencies and tribal governments to carry out research and restoration projects that combine traditional ecological knowledge with Western science, or Two-Eyed Seeing. She advocates for Native best practices in caring for land, incorporating cultural values such as spirituality, reciprocity, and humility, and she works for Native sovereignty in land management in the western US.

== Education ==
Eisenberg was a first-generation Latinx and Native American college student. In her early studies she pursued both science training and literary storytelling. She received her MA from Prescott College in conservation biology and environmental writing.

Eisenberg received her PhD in forestry and wildlife from the Oregon State University College of Forestry. For her dissertation she studied trophic cascades, the top-down effects that the eating habits of apex predators, such as wolves, have on the whole ecological community. She was led to this topic after moving to a cabin in a remote valley of northern Montana next to a meadow. In their first year there, a pair of wolves migrated down from Canada and recolonized the valley. Eisenberg and her family watched as the browsing habits of the resident elk quickly changed, with the elk becoming more vigilant and browsing more warily. Their sparser browsing led to the meadow filling in after just a few seasons with fresh aspen and other trees, which drew birds not seen there before. Intrigued, Eisenberg devoted her doctoral work to the study of trophic cascades in Rocky Mountain landscapes.

Eisenberg completed two postdoctorates in community ecology, one studying how elk, cattle, and aspen affect one another in Colorado, and the other on the effects of prescribed fires on elk, wolves, aspen, and short-grass fescue in Alberta.

== Career ==
Eisenberg was Associate Dean for Inclusive Excellence at Oregon State University College of Forestry. She held the Maybelle Clark Macdonald Director of Tribal Initiatives in Natural Resources endowed chair, and she was Professor of Practice. Within the College of Forestry, she directed the Traditional Ecological Knowledge Lab and the Indigenous National Resource Office. She is a research associate at the Smithsonian and the former chief scientist at Earthwatch Institute, and is a professional member of the Boone and Crockett Club.

In 2014 she published the book The Carnivore Way: Coexisting with and Conserving America's Predators, which asserts that the survival of apex predators heavily relies on their ability to move freely across landscapes. This mobility allows them to adapt to environmental changes and maintain genetic connections between isolated populations. The book examines the conservation status of six threatened carnivore species—wolves, grizzly bears, lynx, wolverines, cougars, and jaguars—highlighting their crucial role in ecosystems. It advocates for a continent-wide conservation initiative designed to facilitate the movement of large predators throughout the Rocky Mountain region, spanning from Mexico to Alaska.

As the chief scientist for Earthwatch Institute, Eisenberg had oversight of fifty projects on six continents, working with Indigenous people and scientists on research and rewilding. She set funding priorities and worked to support people in underserved populations, especially Indigenous women, in becoming scientists. She views rewilding as a healing activity: "It’s about healing landscapes, healing our hearts and our bodies, and it’s about learning and remembering who we are on the earth as humans."

Eisenberg led several long-term restoration projects. The Fort Belknap Grasslands Restoration Project in Montana is a collaboration between the Bureau of Land Management (BLM), the Fort Belknap Indian Community, Oregon State University's Traditional Ecological Knowledge Lab, and the Society for Ecological Restoration. The aims of the project are to manage a healthy prairie using traditional ecological knowledge braided with Western science, or Two-Eyed Seeing, and to empower the local Native community. Seed collecting of native grasses in the project takes place under the auspices of BLM's Seeds of Success program.

She also directed the BLM Pacific Northwest Tribal Forest Restoration and Native Seed Project, which brings together five of the tribal nations in Oregon to restore federal and tribal lands. It uses methods from ethnobotany and ecocultural restoration to center the knowledge and experiences of Native inhabitants of the land and to carry out restoration according to the best practices of traditional ecological knowledge. Activities include collecting seeds for restoration, restoring forests and prairies, and researching and implementing cultural practices such as cultural burning, all of which create career opportunities for tribal youth and make federal and tribal lands more resilient to climate change.

In 2024 Eisenberg co-led a team of forty Indigenous and non-Indigenous forestry scientists and experts in reviewing the state of US forests, an initiative of the White House. The team prepared a report outlining strategies for better long-term stewardship of US forest lands, including incorporating traditional ecological knowledge practices. The report signals a shift toward structuring forest management policy according to more diverse worldviews in order to better address effects of climate change.

Eisenberg advocates for following federal guidelines on tribal data sovereignty, which call for respecting a tribe's place-based knowledge of the land as proprietary and not taking that knowledge off the land to apply it elsewhere. She says that Western science and traditional ecological knowledge share the view that nature is dynamic and holistic and that humans need to "listen to what nature is telling us." She says Indigenous knowledge calls for "listening with humility" and caring for a forest as one would care for family. She regards animals as teachers and writes literary essays about what she learns from them through tracking them in the forest or meeting them in nighttime dreams.

== Selected publications (scientific) ==
- "Predators Create Landscapes of Fear," Scientific American (2010)
- "Conserving Biological Diversity." In Ecological Forest Management, edited by J. F. Franklin, K. N. Johnson, and D. Johnson (Waveland Press, 2018) ISBN 9781478633501
- "Diversifying Ecology by Bridging Western Science and Traditional Ecological Knowledge," Bulletin of the Ecological Society of America, 100, no. 1 (2019)
- C. Eisenberg and M. P. Nelson, "Two-Eyed Seeing: Animal Dignity Through Indigenous and Western Lenses.” In Animal Dignity: Philosophical Reflections on Non-Human Existence, edited by Melanie Challenger (Bloomsbury Publishing, 2023) ISBN 9781350331679
- C. Eisenberg et al., "White House Report: Braiding Indigenous Knowledge and Western Science for Climate-Adapted Forests: An Ecocultural State of Science Report" (2024)

== Selected publications (literary) ==
- "The Wolf Mother," Leaf Litter #5 (2015)
- "The Trophic Tango," About Place 3, no. 3 (2015)
- "All Our Relations," About Place 4, no. 2 (2016)
- "Prodigal Seasons," Whitefish Review #19 (2016)
- "To Know a Prairie," Whitefish Review #20 (2017)
- "Lessons from the Mother Bear: Two-Eyed Seeing and Traditional Ecological Knowledge," About Place 11, no. 1 (2022)

== Books ==
- Eisenberg, Cristina (2010). The Wolf's Tooth: Keystone Predators, Trophic Cascades, and Biodiversity. Washington: Island Press. ISBN 978-1-59726-397-9.
- Eisenberg, Cristina (2014). The Carnivore Way: Coexisting with and Conserving North America's Predators. Washington, DC: Island Press. ISBN 978-1-59726-982-7. OCLC 866615679.
