= Book of the SubGenius =

Book by J. R. "Bob" Dobbs

The Book of the SubGenius
- First edition
- Author: J.R. "Bob" Dobbs and The SubGenius Foundation
- Cover artist: John Hagen-Brenner (1983 edition); Kenneth Huey
- Language: English
- Genre: Satirical religious text
- Publisher: McGraw-Hill
- Publication date: 1983
- Publication place: United States
- Media type: Print (Paperback)
- Pages: 194 (Paperback)
- ISBN: 0-07-062229-9
- Dewey Decimal: 818/.5402 19
- LC Class: PN6231.R4 D6 1983

The Book of the SubGenius: Being the Divine Wisdom, Guidance, and Prophecy of J.R. "Bob" Dobbs, High Epopt of the Church of the SubGenius, Here Inscribed for the Salvation of Future Generations and in the Hope that Slack May Someday Reign on This Earth (ISBN 0-671-63810-6) is seen as the "Bible" of the Church of the SubGenius.

It was compiled from the Church's ongoing zine publication The Stark Fist of Removal. It is usually placed in the humor section of most bookstores, though ordained Subgenius members have been sometimes authorized to move it into the religion section instead.

The book has been republished numerous times, by at least two separate publishers. The original edition was published in 1983 by McGraw-Hill, while the re-release of the book (with the current cover illustration) in 1987 was by Simon & Schuster's imprint Fireside Books (ISBN 0-671-63810-6, "1st Fireside edition").
