= Patricia Monaghan =

American writer (1946–2012)

- Born: February 15, 1946
- Died: November 11, 2012 (aged 66)
- Occupations: poet, writer, scholar, professor; viticulturist
- Spouse(s): Michael McDermott; Warren Mitchell (1969–1978)

Patricia Monaghan (February 15, 1946, – November 11, 2012) was an American poet, writer, and spiritual activist who was an influential figure in the contemporary women's spirituality movement. Monaghan wrote over 20 books on a range of topics including Goddess spirituality, earth spirituality, Celtic mythology, the landscape of Ireland, and techniques of meditation. In 1979, she published the first encyclopedia of female divinities, a book which has remained steadily in print since then and was republished in 2009 in a two volume set as The Encyclopedia of Goddesses and Heroines. She was a mentor to many scholars and writers including biologist Cristina Eisenberg, poet Annie Finch, theologian Charlene Spretnak, and anthropologist Dawn Work-MaKinne, and was the founding member of the Association for the Study of Women and Mythology, which brought together artists, scholars, and researchers of women-centered mythology and Goddess spirituality for the first time in a national academic organization.

== Early life, education, and academic career ==
Patricia Monaghan was born on February 15, 1946. Her parents, Mary Gordon and Edward Monaghan, were Irish-American. Patricia spent her early years on Long Island surrounded by a large extended family. Several years of illness kept her housebound during formative years, during which time she read voraciously as well as learning to embroider, the first of many traditional crafts that were an important part of her leisure throughout her life. When Patricia was in fourth grade, her family moved to Colorado, following the transfer of her father, an Air Force officer. From there, they moved to Alaska.

Monaghan earned her B.A. and her first graduate degree at the University of Minnesota, where she studied English and French literature. She maintained an ongoing interest in French literature, especially in the symbolist poets. After graduate school, she worked as a journalist in both Minnesota and Alaska, writing about culture, nature, and the intersection of the two. She also earned an MFA in creative writing (poetry) from the University of Alaska and a Ph.D in Interdisciplinary Studies (science and literature) from Union Institute in Cincinnati. In 1995, Patricia Monaghan joined the faculty of the School for New Learning at DePaul University, where she taught classes in arts and environmental sciences until 2011, eventually attaining the rank of Full Professor. .

== Spirituality and mythology ==
Throughout her career, Patricia Monaghan's work dealt with issues of spirituality, especially women's spirituality. In 1979, she published the first encyclopedia of female divinities, a book which has remained steadily in print since then and was eventually republished in a two volume set as The Encyclopedia of Goddesses and Heroines. She also published an encyclopedia of Celtic myth, The Encyclopedia of Celtic Myth and Folklore, and edited a three-volume collection of essays entitled Goddesses in World Culture, published in 2010 by ABC-CLIO. Her other books on this subject are The Goddess Path, her original retellings of stories of goddesses from around the world accompanied by poems and meditations; and The Goddess Companion, a collection of goddess-based meditations for each day of the year. Wild Girls: The Path of the Young Goddess re-tells stories for girls about youthful goddesses.

Monaghan held dual Irish and American citizenship. She brought her lifelong interest in Ireland together with her commitment to women's spirituality in The Red-Haired Girl from the Bog: The Landscape of Celtic Myth and Spirit (2003), a poetic yet scholarly recounting of Irish myth, tale, and tradition.

A practitioner of qigong, za-zen and several other forms of meditation, Patricia collaborated with yoga teacher Eleanor (Teri) Viereck to write the encyclopedic Meditation: The Complete Guide, which was published in 1999. A revised and expanded edition included several new sections and expanded resource lists.

A longtime member of the Society of Friends (Quakers), Monaghan was also a companion of the Fourth Order of Sts. Frances and Clare, an interfaith religious organization. She taught workshops on women's spirituality through the Women's Thealogical Institute and the Temple of Diana.

In keeping with her earth-centered spiritual path, Monaghan honored the sacred in nature. Her 1997 book Magical Gardens, a book of garden designs based in mythology, was reissued in 2012. Early in her career, she was a science writer and reporter. At her home in Black Earth, Wisconsin, she and her husband, Michael McDermott, tended a vineyard, orchard, and large organic garden. She was also a wine expert, and author of Wineries of Minnesota and Wisconsin.

At the time of her death, Monaghan had just finished co-editing with her spouse Dr. Michael McDermott an anthology of writings called Brigit: Sun of Womanhood. She was also revising The Encyclopedia of Goddesses and Heroines for a paperback edition. Both can be expected in 2013.

== Poetry ==
Patricia Monaghan's four books of poetry share an emphasis on the book as more than a random collection of poems. Each centers on a specific theme. Her first book, Winterburning, explores the paradoxical connection between fire and ice in the arctic. Her second, Seasons of the Witch (winner of the Friends of Literature Award for poetry and the COVR award for best multimedia work), traces the seasons as metaphors for a woman's life; the poems have been set to music and recorded by Alaskan women artists and are available both within the book and separately. Dancing with Chaos uses the language and concepts of dynamical systems theory to examine human relationships.

Homefront deals with the impact of war on families. Folk composer Michael Smith set a number of the poems to music, and they have been recorded by Jamie O'Reilly as Songs of the Kerry Madwoman. In early 2011, The Grace of Ancient Land, a chapbook, was published by the Voices from the American Land series. It uses the framework of the traditional Mass to express the power of rural life in America's heartland. A longer version of this work, together with poems set in Ireland and capturing the connection of nature, culture and spirituality there, was published by Salmon Poetry under the title Sanctuary.

== Organizational leadership ==
Patricia Monaghan was a founder of and Senior Fellow at The Black Earth Institute, an organization dedicated to inspiring artists to serve the causes of inclusive spirituality, protecting and healing the earth and fighting for social justice. She was also a leader in the founding and development of the Association for the Study of Women and Mythology, an organization committed to recognizing and encouraging Goddess scholarship in academia and Goddess-inspired creative arts.

== Honors and awards ==
Monaghan won a Pushcart Prize (2003) for "Physics and Grief". Her work was also included in Best American Spiritual Writing that year. She won the 2008 Paul Gruchow Memorial Essay Award; the Phoenix Award for Poetry, Crowsnest Environmental Action Society, Alberta, Canada, 2003; and the Spirit of Inquiry Award, DePaul University, 2003.

== Bibliography ==
- 2014 - Mary- A Life in Verse (Dos Madres Press) ISBN 978-1-939929-08-2
- 2012 - Magical Gardens: Cultivating Soil & Spirit (Llewellyn Publications) ISBN 0738731927, ISBN 978-0738731926
- 2011 - Women's Spirituality: Power and Grace with Mary Faulkner (Hampton Roads) ISBN 1571746250, ISBN 978-1571746252
- 2012 - Alaska by Heart Recipes for Independence by Sarah Pagen (McRoy & Blackburn) ISBN 0982031955, ISBN 978-0982031957
- 2010 - Encyclopedia of Goddesses and Heroines. Previous editions 1981 and 1997.
- 2008 - Wineries of Minnesota and Wisconsin (Minnesota Historical Society Press) ISBN 0-87351-617-6, ISBN 978-0-87351-617-4
- 2005 - Wild Girls: The Path of the Young Goddess (Creatrix Resource Library LLC) ISBN 1-56718-442-1
- 2004 - Dancing with Chaos: Poems (Salmon Publishing) ISBN 1-903392-27-6
- 2004 - The Encyclopedia of Celtic Myth and Folklore (Facts on File) ISBN 0-8160-4524-0
- 2004 - Homefront (FootHills Publishing) ISBN 0-941053-31-8, ISBN 978-0-941053-31-0
- 2003 - The Red-Haired Girl from the Bog: The Landscape of Celtic Myth and Spirit (New World Library) ISBN 1-57731-458-1
- 2002 - Seasons of the Witch: Poetry and Songs to the Goddess (Llewellyn Publications; Bk&CD-Rom edition) ISBN 0-7387-0180-7
- 2002 - The New Book of Goddesses and Heroines (3rd Ed) (Llewellyn Publications) ISBN 1-56718-465-0
- 2002 - Irish Spirit: Essays on Irish Spirituality (Interlink) ISBN 0-86327-875-2
- 2001 - Wild Girls: The Path of the Young Goddess (Llewellyn Publications) ISBN 1-56718-442-1
- 1999 - The Office Oracle: Wisdom at Work (Llewellyn Publications) ISBN 1-56718-464-2, ISBN 978-1-56718-464-8
- 1999 - Meditation: The Complete Guide (with Eleanor G. Viereck) (New World Library) ISBN 1-57731-088-8
- 1999 - The Goddess Path: Myths, Invocations, and Rituals (Llewellyn Publications) ISBN 1-56718-467-7
- 1999 - The Goddess Companion: Daily Meditations on the Feminine Spirit (Llewellyn Publications) ISBN 1-56718-463-4
- 1997 - Magical Gardens: Myth, Mulch and Marigolds (Llewellyn Publications) ISBN 1-56718-466-9
- 1994 - O Mother Sun! A New View of the Cosmic Feminine! (Crossing Press) ISBN 0-89594-722-6
- 1993 - The Next Parish Over: Irish-American Writing (New Rivers Press) ISBN 0-89823-150-7
- 1992 - Seasons of the Witch: Poetry and Songs to the Goddess (Delphi Press) ISBN 1-878980-09-2
- 1991 - Winterburning (Fireweed Press) ASIN 0924221108
- 1987 - Unlacing: Ten Irish-American Women Poets (Fireweed Press) ASIN 0924221108 ISBN 0-914221-09-4
- 1983 - Hunger and Dreams: The Alaskan Women's Anthology (Fireweed Press) ISBN 0-914221-00-0
- 1981 - The Book of Goddesses and Heroines (E.P.Dutton) ISBN 0-525-47664-4
- 1981 - Women in Myth and Legend (Junction Books) ISBN 0-86245-051-9, ISBN 978-0-86245-051-9

=== Discography ===
- Songs of the Kerry Madwoman—Music by Michael Smith, sung by Jamie O'Reilly
- 2002 - Seasons of the Witch - Peggy Monaghan (Lyrics & Poetry by Patricia Monaghan) 2-CD set (Arctic Siren) ASIN B00007BK4L
- 1994 - Seasons of the Witch - Peggy Monaghan (Lyrics & Poetry by Patricia Monaghan)
- 1993 - The Way of the Goddess (recorded lecture on cassette)

== Sources ==
- Vale, V. and John Sulak (2001). Modern Pagans. San Francisco: Re/Search Publications. ISBN 1-889307-10-6 pp. 32–5
- Midland Authors Website
- Matrifocus Website
