= Shike (novel) =

1981 novel by Robert Shea

- Author: Robert Shea
- Language: English
- Publisher: Jove Publications
- Publication date: 1981

Shike is a two-volume novel published in 1981 by Robert Shea. It fictionalises and compresses Japanese history in order to incorporate the Genpei War and attempted invasion of Japan by the Mongols within the lifespans of two characters: Jebu, a warrior-monk of mixed parentage (a Mongol father and a Japanese woman) of the Order of Zinja who is a highly fictionalized version of Benkei — and Shima Taniko, the minor noblewoman with whom he falls in love on his first mission — escorting her to an arranged marriage with Prince Horigawa, a far older and extremely influential (but also extremely cunning and malevolent) nobleman. In that regard, the narrative structure of the Shike books bears a close similarity to Shea's 1986 All Things Are Lights, which also focuses on star-crossed lovers.

The over-all story is about how Jebu and Taniko are forced onto opposing sides of a civil war, and Taniko's growth as a woman whose fate moves her from one powerful man to another, eventually becoming grandmother to a shōgun. In all, the story can be viewed as a tragedy, as Taniko's social importance and Jebu's loyalty to his order will always prevent them from truly being together.

Also focused on is the contrast of hypocrisies between the noble class and warrior class. The nobles consider samurai beneath them but act in many of the barbarous ways that they accuse them of, and the samurai are presented as ruffians of shifting loyalties, despite considering themselves to be genteel and worldly.

Shike posits a clan of grey-clad warrior monks, the "Zinja", which, it is stated by Abbot Taitaro, is related to several other secret societies throughout history, including specifically the White Lotus Society in China, the Hashishim (assassins) in the Middle East, and the Knights Templar in Europe, among others. Through an aside in All Things Are Lights, the Zinja are therefore linked, however tenuously, to Shea's other writings on secret societies, most notably his work with Robert Anton Wilson in The Illuminatus! Trilogy.

== Historical Ties ==
Many characters within Shike are based around actual historical figures.

- Kublai Khan and other Mongol Khans are mentioned within the book as well as an interesting portrayal of Arghun Khan prior to his days as a khan with the name Arghun Bagadhur.
- Minamoto no Yoshitsune is represented loosely by Muratomo no Yukio, where the two warring families of the Genpei War are represented as Muratomo and Takashi instead of Minamoto and Taira.
- Minamoto no Yoritomo is portrayed as Muratomo no Hideyori
- The Hōjō clan is represented as the Shima clan, Taniko's family. They even share the same Mon (emblem), depicted as small white triangle inverted within a larger orange triangle.

== Free Creative Commons version ==
In January 2008 Mike Shea link, son of the author Bob Shea, released the book under a Creative Commons Attribution Non-Commercial Share-Alike license link
