= J. R. "Bob" Dobbs =

Figurehead of the Church of the SubGenius

J. R. "Bob" Dobbs

J. R. "Bob" Dobbs is the putative figurehead of the parody religion the Church of the SubGenius. His image is derived from a collection of clip art distributed by the Bell Telephone Company of West Texas in 1946.

According to SubGenius dogma, "Bob" was a salesman who, in 1953, saw a vision of the god JHVH-1 on a television set he had built. The vision inspired him to write or dictate the "PreScriptures" (as described in the Book of the SubGenius) and found the Church. The theology holds that "Bob" is the greatest salesman who ever lived, and has cheated death a number of times. He is also revered for his great follies and believed to be a savior of "Slack". He was assassinated in San Francisco in 1984, though the Church claims that he has come back from the dead several times since then.

The quotation marks in "Bob"'s name are always included when spelling his name, according to the Church.

== Personal history ==
According to Revelation X; The "Bob" Apocryphon, "Bob" was born in Dallas, Texas, to Xinucha-Chi-Xan M. Dobbs (a pharmacist) and Jane McBride Dobbs. At an early age, he possessed a talent for making large amounts of money by playing the stock market over the telephone. He married his wife Constance "Connie" Marsh in Las Vegas in 1955 and worked as a photographer's model while inventing and patenting novelty gag items. In 1957, he worked weekends doing Evangelical Christian preaching "strictly for the money".

== Connie Dobbs ==
Constance "Connie" Marsh Dobbs, the wife of "Bob", has become nearly as legendary in SubGenius circles as "Bob". Although "Bob" has been married to other women, spirits, deities, and inanimate objects, Connie is described in the SubGenius documentary Arise! as "his first, and still his primary wife". Connie, an actress and model who formed the Home for Slackless Children, is the patron of SubGenius women, and she is seen as a vision of true liberation for women. She refuses to submit to anyone (especially "Bob"). She is just as free-wheeling and promiscuous as her husband, although she has a more level head on her shoulders when it comes to domestic issues.

Connie has been described as the "brains" of the couple, she wrote at a 4th grade level when in 1st grade and let "Bob" copy her homework when they were children. She is also said to be a shapeshifter who celebrated her 100th birthday, and sang, danced, and spoke, at a gathering in 2022.

== Dobbstown ==
According to Church lore, "Bob" and "Connie" travelled to Sarawak, Malaysia, and founded his headquarters, a secret enclave there, called Dobbstown, where he often stays.

== Images of "Bob" ==
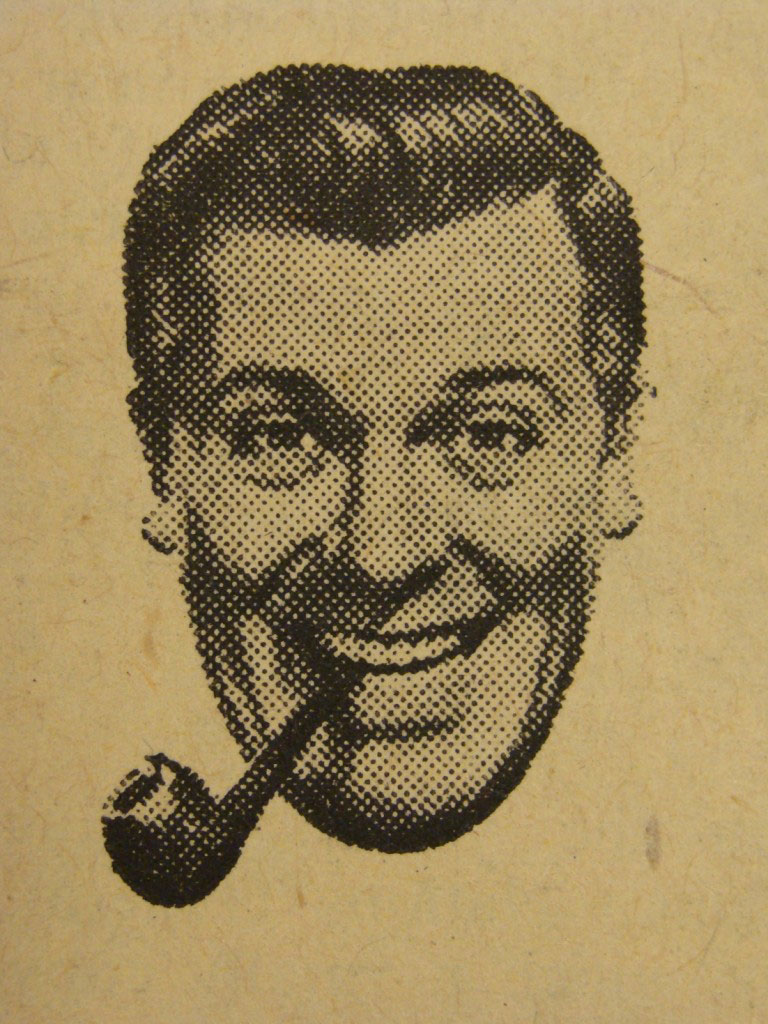
This graphic from a 1956 drug store advertisement bears similarity to the one created later depicting Dobbs

"Bob"'s image first appeared in the original SubGenius publication, SubGenius Pamphlet #1 (a.k.a. "The World Ends Tomorrow and You May Die"; 1979). The Church of the SubGenius maintains the trademark and copyright on "Bob"'s image, though it has tried to avoid taking legal action unless absolutely necessary. "Bob"'s image is commonly seen on the Usenet newsgroup alt.binaries.slack, where he appears regularly in images by many artists. Proper etiquette on the newsgroup dictates that credit be given where it is due, and acknowledgement of the ownership of "Bob"'s image by the Church is accepted by the regular newsgroup participants.

The picture of "Bob" is also used in one of the earliest Linux distributions, Slackware, created by Patrick Volkerding, a member of the Church.

In 2012, a member of the Virginia Newspaper Project who was archiving 1956 copies of the Blue Ridge Herald found an advertisement for Edward's Drug Store in Leesburg, Virginia, that included the floating head of a pipe-smoking character similar in appearance to "Bob".

== Sacred Ikon ==
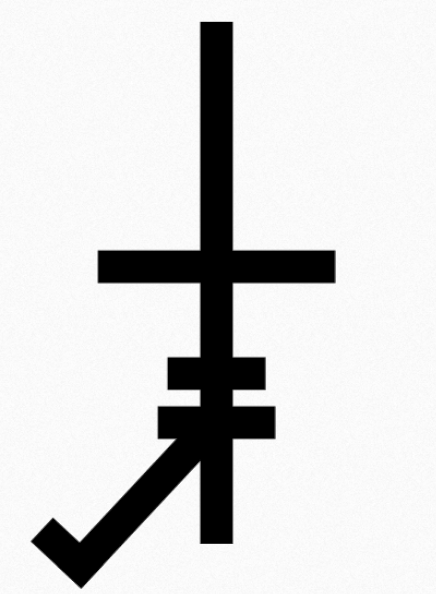
The Sacred Ikon

Around 2002, the Church adopted a new symbol called the "Sacred Ikon" or "Dobbs Ikon", which is a stylized cross consisting of three bars and a pipe, placed in a pattern that matches the eyes, nose, mouth, and pipe of "Bob"'s image.

== In popular culture ==
Since his initial appearance, his face has appeared in numerous places around the world, and it has made cameo appearances on everything from graffiti art on highway overpasses and as part of the graphical character set of the Atari ST operating system, to musical albums by many underground bands (and several popular mainstream rock bands, ranging from Devo to Sublime) and the occasional film (The Wizard of Speed and Time), TV show (Pee-wee's Playhouse) and cartoon (SpongeBob SquarePants). There are also two German comics with "Bob" (Future Subjunkies and Space Bastards, both by Gerhard Seyfried and Ziska Riemann).

Robert Anton Wilson's short story "The Horror on Howth Hill" involves a conversation between Dobbs and the mad scientist De Selby.

J. R. "Bob" Dobbs served as the inspiration for the character of Professor Utonium in the cartoon The Powerpuff Girls. The DC Comics character Doc Magnus also bears a strong visual resemblance to "Bob".

In its January 1, 2000, issue, a Time Internet-based poll named J. R. "Bob" Dobbs the No. 1 "Phoney or Fraud" of the 20th century, with noted journalist Geraldo Rivera placing second.
