= Association for Consciousness Exploration =

American organization

The Association for Consciousness Exploration LLC (ACE) is an American organization based in Northeastern Ohio which produces events, books, and recorded media in the fields of "magic, mind-sciences, alternative lifestyles, comparative religion/spirituality, entertainment, holistic healing, and related subjects."

== History ==
The organization was founded in 1983 by members of the Chameleon Club (founded in 1978), and their fictional founder, C. C. Rosencomet, on the campus of Case Western Reserve University in Cleveland, Ohio. Its primary directors included Jeff Rosenbaum (died August 31, 2014).

As a campus organization they offered concerts by local musicians, offered a film series, and hosted appearances by Jim Alan and Selena Fox of Circle Sanctuary, Raymond Buckland, and the first Cleveland appearance of Timothy Leary (at Amasa Stone Chapel).

In the 1980s, they also ran a "mind spa", providing hands-on experience with mind machines, biofeedback devices, and a sensory isolation tank.

The motto of the Chameleon Club is "CHANGE", and ACE's is "Dedicated to the Expansion of the Frontiers of Your Consideration". ACE was originally located at The Civic, a former synagogue in Cleveland Heights, Ohio, and there offered classes and featured appearances of Robert Anton Wilson and Robin Williamson.

== Activities and functions ==
ACE hosts the annual Starwood Festival, a summer camping event held in July, and the annual WinterStar Symposium, usually held in February. ACE maintains the Starwood Center, a workshop/seminar/bookstore facility in Cleveland, Ohio, and produces and sells books, tapes, CDs and DVDs documenting performances, lectures and panel discussions from their events.

== See also ==
- John C. Lilly
