= Quantum Psychology =

1990 book by Robert Anton Wilson

- Author: Robert Anton Wilson
- Language: English
- Subject: Consciousness, Psychology, Linguistics
- Publisher: New Falcon Publications
- Publication date: 1990
- Publication place: United States
- Pages: 208
- ISBN: 978-1561840717
- OCLC: 42893837

Quantum Psychology: How Brain Software Programs You & Your World is a book written by novelist and nonfiction writer Robert Anton Wilson, originally published in 1990. It deals with what Wilson himself calls "quantum psychology,"

== Overview ==
Like Wilson's earlier Prometheus Rising, Quantum Psychology features practical exercises to demonstrate its concepts at the end of each chapter (this time intended for groups rather than a lone reader). It focuses primarily on the metaphysical and epistemological problems of Aristotelian reasoning and its use in everyday language, covering E-Prime (Wilson wrote the book in E-Prime) and how it addresses many of the semantic (and resulting perceptual) "spooks" that common language lets in.

It also covers psychosomatic healing and a possible explanation for it; non-local effects in quantum physics (Bell's theorem) and the theories of David Bohm; and a brief recap of the Timothy Leary eightfold consciousness theory of human consciousness which Prometheus Rising covers in greater detail.

Alternative cover design

Alternative cover design
