= Consensus =

Consensus usually refers to general agreement among a group of people or community. It may also refer to:

== Sociology ==
- Consensus decision-making, the process of making decisions using consensus.
- Consensus-based assessment, the use of consensus to produce methods of evaluating information.

== Political theory ==
- Consensus democracy, democracy where consensus decision-making is used to create, amend or repeal legislation.

== Religion ==
- Ijma', consensus or agreement of Muslim scholars/jurists, basically on religious issues.

== Philosophy ==
- Consensus reality, reality as defined by consensus, particularly popular consensus, rather than or before other (philosophical) criteria.
- Consensus theory of truth, truth as determined by consensus rather than or before other criteria.

== Psychology ==
- False-consensus effect, a tendency to overestimate the extent to which beliefs or opinions match those of others.

== Science and technology ==
- Scientific consensus
- Consensus (computer science), techniques to provide coherence among and between nodes of a distributed computer system or database.
- Consensus sequence, the order of nucleotide or amino acid residues most frequently found within a DNA, RNA or protein sequence.
- Consensus theorem, an identity in Boolean algebra.
  - Consensus or resolvent term, defined in the consensus theorem.

== Professional ==
- Scientific consensus, the collective opinion, judgment and position of scientists as regards matters of fact, especially with reference to a particular scientific or science-related issue.
- Medical consensus, a public statement of what is taken to be the consensus among medical experts as regards an aspect or aspects of medical knowledge.

== Political Events ==
- 1992 Consensus, used to refer to the outcome of a meeting held in 1992 between semi-official representatives of the People's Republic of China (PRC) and the Republic of China (ROC).
- Monterrey Consensus, the outcome of the United Nations International Conference on Financing for Development held in Monterrey, Mexico, in 2002.

== Policy ==
- Copenhagen Consensus, a think tank-like project that uses welfare economics and cost–benefit analysis to recommend priorities and investment in global welfare.
- Washington Consensus, an informal name for a set of economic policies commonly prescribed by institutions based in Washington D.C. such as the International Monetary Fund (IMF) and World Bank.

== See also ==
- Consent (disambiguation)
- Consensus conference (disambiguation)
- ConsenSys, blockchain company
