= Hagbard Celine =

Fictional character in The Illuminatus! Trilogy

- The Illuminatus! Trilogy character
- First appearance: The Eye in the Pyramid (1975)
- Created by: Robert Shea; Robert Anton Wilson

In-universe information
- Full name: Howard Crane
- Alias: Hagbard Celine
- Species: Human
- Gender: Male

Hagbard Celine is a central protagonist in The Illuminatus! Trilogy series of books by Robert Shea and Robert Anton Wilson named after the legendary Viking hero Hagbard, who died for love. In the Schrödinger's Cat Trilogy written after Illuminatus!, it is stated that "Hagbard Celine" is a pseudonym and that his legal name is Howard Crane. However, the trilogy passes through many different universes.

== Character ==
Hagbard has parallels to Jules Verne's character, Captain Nemo. Both are genius captains aboard a fantastic submarine. Both are rogues who have mostly broken off from society, yet help the oppressed. Some have even theorized that Hagbard Celine is Captain Nemo, though Verne's Twenty Thousand Leagues Under the Seas is set in the second half of the nineteenth century. He is also comparable to a degree to Ragnar Danneskjold, a libertarian pirate in Ayn Rand's novel Atlas Shrugged, which is spoofed in the chronicles as "Telemachus Sneezed". Like Danneskjold, Hagbard participates in the black market, exploiting and resisting governments, and both characters have Norwegian roots.

Hagbard is a notorious prankster and liar (telling one character not to trust anyone with the initials H.C.). This character trait is displayed throughout Illuminatus!. Celine tends to give misinformation about himself and his intentions and that he faked the death of an actress, implied to be Marilyn Monroe, in order to train her into becoming an embodiment of the goddess Eris. Celine subsequently fell in love with the woman and announces his intention to marry her during the trilogy.

A Discordian anarchist, he fights the Illuminati from a golden submarine, the Leif Ericson (named after the Viking explorer). The submarine was supposedly designed and built by himself, stolen from the United States Navy, or a gift from the Mafia. Despite its size—the equivalent of five city blocks long with a three-story-high conning tower—it has so far remained undetected.

He has a Norwegian mother and a Sicilian father, physically resembling Anthony Quinn. In a section printed in the introductions of volumes I and II of the trilogy, though not reprinted in the single-volume compilation, the narrator mentions that he has a raft of Irish relatives in Ohio named McGee and Marlowe. Wilson also implies in The Historical Illuminatus Chronicles that Hagbard is related to one of the central characters, Sigismundo Celine.

He speaks Norwegian, Italian, English, German, Latin, Greek and Swahili. He graduated from Harvard with a somewhat strange double major in contract law and naval engineering.

A former naturalized United States citizen, Hagbard supposedly relinquished his citizenship after representing a Mohawk reservation in court against the Bureau of Indian Affairs. Hagbard generally told people he was an engineer building a dam during his time with the Mohawk because he was ashamed of being a lawyer.

He later became a citizen of Equatorial Guinea, of which Fernando Poo is a part, having papers referring to this by the time of the Walpurgisnacht rock concert. The appendix to the trilogy mentions that Hagbard builds a starship and leaves to explore Alpha Centauri in the year 1999.

Hagbard designed a supercomputer called the First Universal Cybernetic Kinetic Ultramicro-Programmer. Among other things, he used to calculate the chances of World War III starting, which it does by throwing virtual I Ching sticks.

His manifesto is called Never Whistle While You're Pissing, containing his Definitions and Distinctions, an anarchist interpretation of capitalist concepts.

== See also ==
- Celine's Laws
