= Reality tunnel =

Theory of personal perception

Reality tunnel is a theory that, with a subconscious set of mental filters formed from beliefs and experiences, every individual interprets the same world differently, hence "Truth is in the eye of the beholder". It is similar to the idea of representative realism, and was coined by Timothy Leary. It was further expanded on by Robert Anton Wilson, who wrote about the idea extensively in his 1983 book Prometheus Rising.

Wilson and Leary co-wrote a chapter in Leary's 1988 book Neuropolitique (a revised edition of the 1977 book Neuropolitics), in which they explained further:

The gene-pool politics which monitor power struggles among terrestrial humanity are transcended in this info-world, i.e. seen as static, artificial charades. One is neither coercively manipulated into another's territorial reality nor forced to struggle against it with reciprocal game-playing (the usual soap opera dramatics). One simply elects, consciously, whether or not to share the other's reality tunnel.

== Considerations ==
Wilson is quoted as having said in a late lecture that:

Every type of bigotry—every time of racism, sexism, prejudice, every dogmatic ideology that allows people to kill other people with a clear conscience, every stupid cult, every superstition-ridden religion; every kind of ignorance in the world all results from not realizing that our perceptions are gambles. We believe what we see, and then we believe our interpretation of it; we don't even know we are making an interpretation most of the time. We think this is reality. In philosophy that's called naïve realism.

The idea does not necessarily imply that there is no objective truth; rather, that our access to it is mediated through our senses, experience, conditioning, prior beliefs, and other non-objective factors. The implied individual world each person occupies is said to be their reality tunnel. The term can also apply to groups of people united by beliefs: we can speak of the fundamentalist Christian reality tunnel or the ontological naturalist reality tunnel.

A parallel can be seen in the psychological concept of confirmation bias—the human tendency to notice and assign significance to observations that confirm existing beliefs, while filtering out or rationalizing away observations that do not fit with prior beliefs and expectations. This helps to explain why reality tunnels are usually transparent to their inhabitants. While it seems most people take their beliefs to correspond to the "one true objective reality", Robert Anton Wilson emphasizes that each person's reality tunnel is their own artistic creation, whether they realize it or not.

Wilson—like John C. Lilly in his 1968 book Programming and Metaprogramming in the Human Biocomputer—relates that through various techniques one can break down old reality tunnels and impose new reality tunnels by removing old filters and replacing them with new ones, with new perspectives on reality—at will. This is attempted through various processes of deprogramming using neuro-linguistic programming, cybernetics, hypnosis, biofeedback devices, meditation, controlled use of hallucinogens, and forcibly acting out other reality tunnels. Thus, it is believed one's reality tunnel can be widened to take full advantage of human potential and experience reality on more positive levels. Robert Anton Wilson's Prometheus Rising is (among other things) a guidebook to the exploration of various reality tunnels.

== Parallels ==
In line with Kantian thought as given in the Critique of Pure Reason, as well as the work of Norwood Russell Hanson, human cognition has been described as either a filter or a set of filters in academic studies. This "filtering" is largely unconscious and may be influenced—more-or-less in many ways, in societies and in individuals—by biology, cultural constructs including education and language (such as memes), life experiences, preferences and mental state, belief systems (e.g. world view, the stock market), momentary needs, pathology, etc. An everyday example of such filtering is the ability to follow a conversation or read sentences without being distracted by surrounding conversations or sentences, which has been named the cocktail party effect.

In his 1986 book Waking Up, Charles Tart—an American psychologist and parapsychologist known for his psychological work on the nature of consciousness—introduced the phrase "consensus trance" to the lexicon. Tart likened normal waking consciousness to hypnotic trance. He discussed how each of us is from birth inducted to the trance of the society around us. Tart noted both similarities and differences between hypnotic trance induction and consensus trance induction. (See G. I. Gurdjieff).

Some disciplines—Zen for example, and monastic schools such as Sufism—have been described in neuroscientific terms as incidentally providing strategies to overcome conditioned realities by producing and entering less aroused states of consciousness, particularly with less responses from the nervous system.

Pyrrhonism also seeks to overcome these conditioned realities by inducing epoche (suspension of judgment) through skeptical arguments. Meanwhile, constructivism has been described as a modern psychological response to reality-tunneling.

For Wilson, a fully functioning human ought to be aware of their reality tunnel, and be able to keep it flexible enough to accommodate, and to some degree empathize with, different reality tunnels, different "game rules", different cultures ... Constructivist thinking is the exercise of metacognition to become aware of our reality tunnels or labyrinths and the elements that "program" them. Constructivist thinking should, ideally, decrease the chance that we will confuse our map of the world with the actual world ... [This philosophy] is currently expressed in many Eastern consciousness-exploration techniques.

== See also ==
- 8-Circuit Model of Consciousness
- Allegory of the Cave
- Altered state of consciousness
- Collective consciousness
- Collective unconscious
- Consensus reality
- Consensus theory of truth
- Cosmic consciousness
- Direct and indirect realism
- Fake news
- General semantics
- Hyperphantasia
- Idealism
- Ideasthesia
- Intellectual scotoma
- Paradigm
- Perspectivism
- Phaneron
- Phenomenology
- Philosophy of Perception
- Sensorium
- Schema (psychology)
- Social constructionism
- The Social Construction of Reality
- Self-concept
- Theory of Mind
- Tunnel vision (metaphor)
- Umwelt
- "Who is the master that sees and hears?"
- World view
