= The Illuminati Papers =

1980 book by Robert Anton Wilson

- Author: Robert Anton Wilson
- Language: English
- Subject: Consciousness, linguistics, politics
- Publisher: And/Or Press
- Publication date: 1980
- Publication place: United States
- Pages: 162
- ISBN: 1-57951-002-7

The Illuminati Papers is a collection of essays and other works by Robert Anton Wilson first published in 1980 (ISBN 1-57951-002-7).

== Overview ==
The book expands upon characters and themes from his earlier The Illuminatus! Trilogy (written with Robert Shea) and most of the essays are written from the point of view of the characters in Illuminatus! Topics Wilson writes on cover politics, science, the future, hedonism and consciousness. The book's essays and stories are illustrated with line drawings, message banners, cartoons, office memos and interviews. "The RICH Economy" presents Wilson's economic thoughts on Basic income. In it Wilson synthesize several concepts and gives them the acronym RICH. An online version is available.

The essay collection appears to recapitulate an idea presented in James S. Albus's 1976 book: Peoples' Capitalism: The Economics of the Robot Revolution, although Wilson proposes to prevent inflation through a gradual phase-in of a National Dividend rather than Albus' idea of a mandatory savings plan.

The Illuminati Papers is sometimes referenced as a sequel to Illuminatus! as are other works such as Masks of the Illuminati and the Cosmic Trigger, and The Historical Illuminatus Chronicles series of books. The Schrödinger's Cat trilogy is similar in length, writing style, plot devices and the use of parallel universes for the novel's settings.

== See also ==
- Guerrilla ontology
