= Celine's laws =

Theme in Robert Anton Wilson's & Robert Shea's The Illuminatus! Trilogy

Celine's Laws are a series of three laws regarding government and social interaction attributed to the fictional character Hagbard Celine in Robert Anton Wilson's and Robert Shea's The Illuminatus Trilogy. Celine, a gentleman anarchist, serves as a mouthpiece for Wilson's libertarian, anarchist and sometimes completely uncategorizable ideas about the nature of humanity. The trilogy outlines Celine's Laws in a manifesto titled Never Whistle While You're Pissing. Wilson later elaborates on the laws in his nonfiction book, Prometheus Rising, as being inherent consequences of average human psychology.

A piece entitled Celine's Laws appears in Robert Anton Wilson's The Illuminati Papers, which features articles written by Wilson under the guise of many of his characters from The Illuminatus! Trilogy, alongside interviews with the author himself. One article pulls from another, as well as from the original Trilogy.

Celine, in his manifesto, recognizes these as generalities, but also says that their basic principles can be used to find the source of every great decline and fall of nations, and goes on to claim they are as universal as Newton's Laws in applying to everything.

== Celine's First Law ==
"National Security is the chief cause of national insecurity."

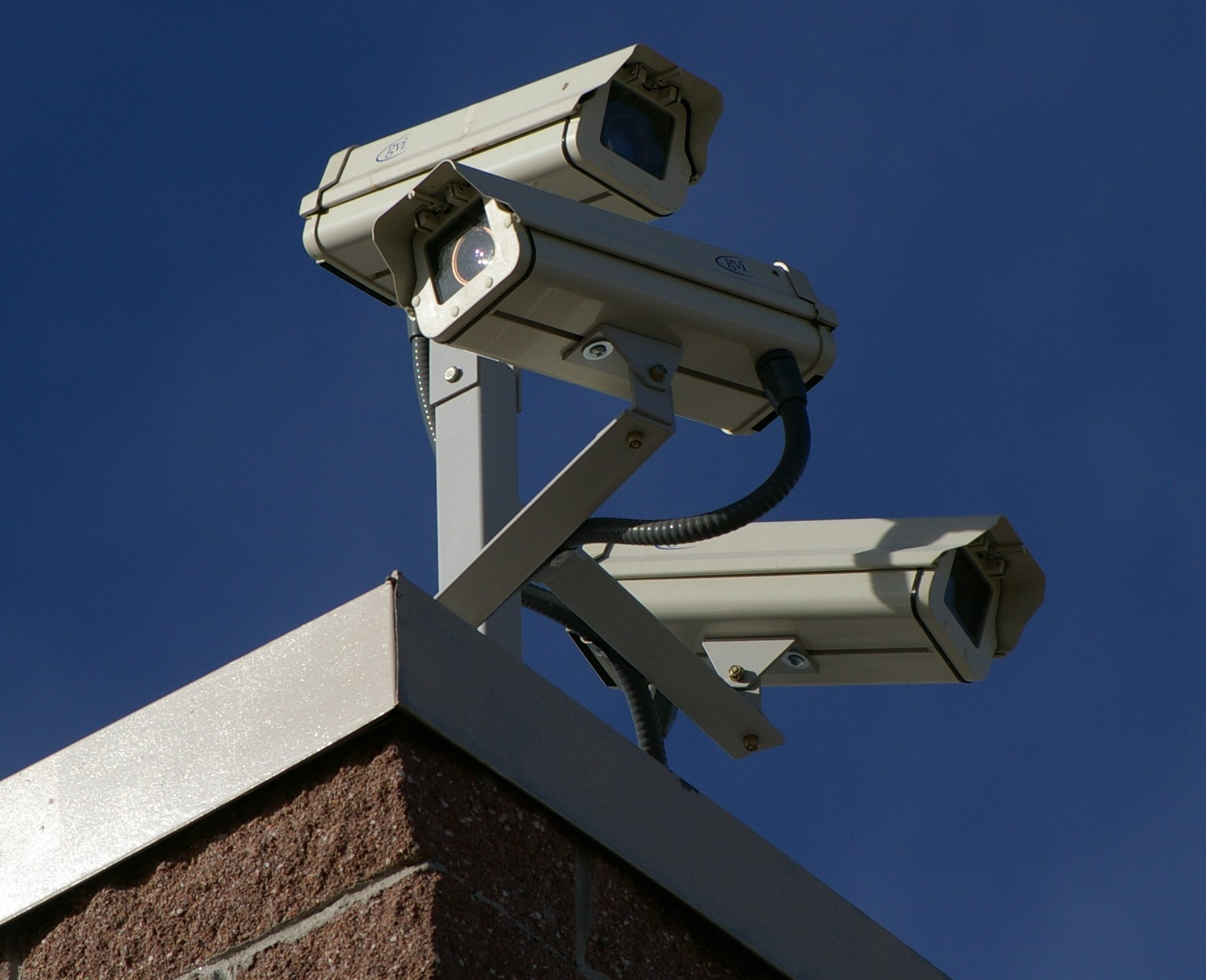
Obsession with national security creates a surveillance state that is more a threat to the citizens than the threat it seeks to confront.

Reflecting the paranoia of the Cold War, Celine's First Law focuses on the common idea that to have national security, one must create a secret police. Since internal revolutionaries and external foes would make the secret police a prime target for infiltration, and because the secret police would by necessity have vast powers to blackmail and intimidate other members of the government, another higher set of secret police must be created to monitor the secret police. And an even higher set of secret police must then be created to monitor the higher order of secret police. Repeat ad nauseam.

This seemingly infinite regress goes on until every person in the country is spying on another, or until "the funding runs out." And since this paranoid and self-monitoring situation inherently makes targets of a nation's own citizens, the average person in the nation is more threatened by the massive secret police complex than by whatever foe they were seeking to protect themselves from. Wilson points out that the Soviet Union, which suffered from this in spades, got to the point that it was terrified of painters and poets who could do little harm to them in reality.

At the same time, given the limitation of funding and scale, the perfect security state never truly emerges, leaving the populace still vulnerable from the original threat while also being threatened by the vast and Orwellian secret police.

== Celine's Second Law ==
"Accurate communication is possible only in a non-punishing situation."

Wilson uses the eye in the pyramid as a symbol of the dysfunction of hierarchies. Every level except the top is blind, but the eye can see only one way.

Wilson rephrases this himself many times as "communication occurs only between equals". Celine calls this law "a simple statement of the obvious" and refers to the fact that everyone who labors under an authority figure tends to lie to and flatter that authority figure in order to protect themselves either from violence or from deprivation of security (such as losing one's job). In essence, it is usually more in the interests of any worker to tell his boss what he wants to hear, not what is true.

In any hierarchy, every level below the highest carries a subtle burden to see the world in the way their superiors expect it to be seen and to provide feedback to their superiors that their superiors want to hear. In the end, any hierarchical organization supports what its leaders already think is true more than it challenges them to think differently. The levels below the leaders are more interested in keeping their jobs than telling the truth.

Wilson, in Prometheus Rising, uses the example of J. Edgar Hoover's FBI. Hoover saw communist infiltrators and spies everywhere, and he told his agents to hunt them down. Therefore, FBI agents began seeing and interpreting everything they could as parts of the communist conspiracy. Some even went as far as framing people as communists, making largely baseless arrests and doing everything they could to satisfy Hoover's need to find and drive out the communist conspiracy. The problem is, such a conspiracy was greatly exaggerated. Hoover thought it was monolithic and pervasive, and any agent who dared point out the lack of evidence to Hoover would be at best denied promotions, and at worst labeled a communist himself and lose his job. Any agent who knew the truth would be very careful to hide the fact.

Meanwhile, the FBI was largely ignoring the problem of organized crime (the Mafia), because Hoover insisted that organized crime did not exist on the national scale. Not only does the leader of the hierarchy see what he wants to see, but he also does not see what he does not want to see. Agents who pursued the issue of organized crime were sometimes marginalized within the organization or hounded into retirement.

In the end, Celine states, any hierarchy acts more to conceal the truth from its leaders than it serves to find the truth.

== Celine's Third Law ==
"An honest politician is a national calamity."

Celine recognizes that the third law seems preposterous from the beginning. While a dishonest politician is interested only in bettering his own lot through abusing the public trust, an honest politician is far more dangerous since he is honestly interested in bettering society through political action, and that means writing and implementing more and more laws.

Celine argues that creating more laws simply creates more criminals. Laws inherently restrict individual freedom, and the explosive rate at which laws are being created means that every citizen in the course of his daily life does not have the research capacity to not violate at least one of the plethora of laws. It is only through honest politicians trying to change the world through laws that true tyranny can come into being through excessive legislation.

Corrupt politicians are known to redirect funds into their possession. People may be limited in their abilities by the installation of many laws. So corrupt politicians are preferable according to Celine, despite the possibility of an honest politician who honestly opposes the formation of new laws (or wants to do away with some).

== See also ==
- Quis custodiet ipsos custodes?
- Sycophancy
