= Ishtar Rising =

1989 book by Robert Anton Wilson

- Author: Robert Anton Wilson
- Language: English
- Subject: Religion
- Publisher: New Falcon Publications
- Publication date: 1989
- Publication place: United States
- Pages: 224
- ISBN: 1-56184-109-9

Ishtar Rising, fully titled Ishtar Rising: Why the Goddess Went to Hell and What to Expect Now That She's Returning, is a book by Robert Anton Wilson published in 1989. It is a revision of Wilson's earlier The Book of the Breast, first published by Playboy Press in 1974, which contained many images not present in the current version. In it Wilson discusses his ideas on the female form, feminism and ancient Goddess worship.

Alternative cover design

Cover of The Book of the Breast
