= Reality Is What You Can Get Away With =

1992 published screenplay

- Author: Robert Anton Wilson
- Language: English
- Genre: screenplay
- Publisher: New Falcon Publications
- Publication date: 1992
- Publication place: United States
- Pages: 176
- ISBN: 1-56184-080-7

Reality is What You Can Get Away With is an illustrated screenplay by Robert Anton Wilson first published in 1992, followed by a second edition in 1996.
