= Wilhelm Reich in Hell =

- Author: Robert Anton Wilson
- Language: English
- Genre: play
- Publisher: New Falcon Publications
- Publication date: 1987
- Publication place: United States
- Pages: 170
- ISBN: 1-56184-108-0

Wilhelm Reich in Hell is a play written by Robert Anton Wilson and published as a book in 1987. The play has been staged several times, with productions in Santa Cruz, Dublin, Los Angeles, and San Francisco. The play is about Wilhelm Reich, whose writings on orgone and psychoanalysis were burned by the US government in 1956, in a fictional afterlife trial. The many factual and fictional characters in the play include Marilyn Monroe, Uncle Sam, and Wilhelm Reich himself. It has been described as a punk rock drama by Wilson. It shares similarities with The Devil and Daniel Webster, one of Wilson's favorite films in his youth.

Besides a long essay by Wilson, the book contains two forewords: one by Christopher Hyatt, the other by Donald Holmes.

== Content ==
Reich is prosecuted in Hell by Marquis de Sade and Leopold von Sacher-Masoch, portrayed as circus comedians. The American Medical Association, presented as a punk rock group, delivers Reich's insanity diagnosis in aggressive song. The conductor of the proceedings, a circus ringmaster, insists that Reich must prove everyone else insane to be exonerated. Many characters from across the American ideological conflicts are present, like Marilyn Monroe and Ronald Reagan, as witnesses. The play is a social critique of society's artificial distinctions between good and evil, sanity and insanity, and the infringement of people's natural freedoms.

== See also ==
- List of plays with anti-war themes
