= Sex, Drugs and Magick =

1973 book by Robert Anton Wilson

Sex, Drugs and Magick: A Journey Beyond Limits
- Author: Robert Anton Wilson
- Language: English
- Subject: Sex, Drugs, Magic
- Publisher: New Falcon Publications
- Publication date: 1988
- Publication place: United States
- Pages: 186
- ISBN: 1-56184-001-7

Sex, Drugs and Magick: A Journey Beyond Limits is a book by Robert Anton Wilson, first published in 1973 as Sex and Drugs: A Journey Beyond Limits by Playboy Press. It was Wilson's intention to call the book Sex, Drugs and the Occult, however the 'occult' was removed at the insistence of Playboy head Hugh Hefner. The updated title stems from the 1987 revision which included a new preface by the author. Wilson added another preface to the 2000 edition. The book focuses on the connection between sex, the use of drugs and occult practices and how these can be combined for maximum benefit. This is illustrated with examples from history, religion and his own personal experience. Wilson also details the potential dangers of drugs use.
