= TSOG: The Thing That Ate the Constitution =

Book by Robert Anton Wilson

- Author: Robert Anton Wilson
- Illustrator: Linda Joyce Franks
- Cover artist: Linda Joyce Franks
- Language: English
- Subjects: Current affairs, American politics
- Publisher: New Falcon Publications
- Publication date: 2002
- Publication place: United States
- Pages: 224
- ISBN: 1-56184-169-2

TSOG: The Thing That Ate the Constitution is a book by Robert Anton Wilson published in 2002. TSOG stands for "Tsarist Occupational Government", stemming from Wilson's belief that there were strong parallels with the oppressive Tsarist government of pre-revolutionary Russia and the United States government under George W. Bush. It focuses on issues such as civil liberties, the influence of faith-based organisations on the government and the war on drugs.
