= The New Inquisition =

1986 book by Robert Anton Wilson

- Author: Robert Anton Wilson
- Language: English
- Subject: Science, Scientific materialism, fundamentalism
- Publisher: New Falcon Publications
- Publication date: 1986
- Publication place: United States
- Pages: 240
- ISBN: 1-56184-002-5

The New Inquisition is a book written by Robert Anton Wilson and first published in 1986. The New Inquisition is a book about ontology, science, paranormal events, and epistemology. Wilson identifies what he calls "Fundamentalist Materialism" belief and compares it to religious fundamentalism.

== Description ==
In The New Inquisition Wilson criticizes the Committee for the Scientific Investigation of Claims of the Paranormal by claiming that scientists do not give a fair hearing to anyone they do not already agree with. Something else he criticizes is that the dependence on the military-industrial complex is the norm. He proclaims that instead of this dictatory attitude scientists should apply skepticism, or a kind of agnostic principle, when faced with new ideas.

According to Wilson, science these days glorifies the "Idol of Materialism". He calls their belief "Fundamental Materialism" and likens it to religious fundamentalists. Wilson suggests a principle that "refuses total belief or total denial and regards models as tools to be used only and always where appropriate and replaced (by other models) only and always where not appropriate". It is intended to be deliberately shocking, as Wilson states that he "does not want its ideas to seem any less startling than they are."

=== Topics ===
The book's subtitle Irrational Rationalism and Citadel of Science, summarizes its topics;

- 'Models, Metaphors and Idols'
  comments on primate psychology and quantum mechanics
  'Skepticism and Blind Faith'
  comments on book burning, biological surrealism and Game Rules
  'Two More Heretics and Some Further Blasphemies'
  comments on werewolves and other things
  'The Dance of Shiva'
  comments on Bell's theorem, Po and mysterious fires
  'Chaos and the Abyss'
  comments on phantom kangaroos and other things
  '"Mind", "Matter" and Monism'
  comments on coincidence
  'The Open Universe'
  further comments on energy fluctuations and "spooks"
  'Creative Agnosticism'
  further comments on the human brain, and how to use one

=== Summary ===
It seems to me that existence - at this point I have doubts about 'the' 'universe' - is a lot like a Rorschach ink-blot. Everybody looks at it and sees their own favorite reality-tunnel

— Robert Anton Wilson,
commenting on absolutism

The New Inquisition is the author's term for what he refers to as a tendency within mainstream science to forbid certain forms of theories from being classed as "science." He cites the cases of Wilhelm Reich, Rupert Sheldrake, and the Mars effect controversy, among others, in support of a central claim that a materialist bias within the scientific community has led to some speculations and theories he claimed were unjustly thought of as unscientific.

The Citadel is the author's term for the military-industrial complex that he claims funds mainstream science and is the source of its bias. The book lists a large list of paranormal reports, (from the Fortean Times among others) with Wilson's tour of the history of modern physics. He is particularly interested in Bell's theorem, and Alain Aspect's experimental proof of Bell's theorem. Wilson opines that the implications of Aspect's proof include that magic is possible, and that "the sum total of all minds is one". He claims it is not a coincidence that the Darwinian model of evolution best suits the "reality tunnel" of the Citadel, and that biologists such as Sheldrake who have alternative theories of evolution are drummed out of mainstream science.

On the topic, he states,

[... the] Scientific Method (SM) [is] the alleged source of the certitude of those I call the New Idolators. SM is a mixture of SD (sense data: usually aided by instruments to refine the senses) with the old Greek PR [pure reason]. Unfortunately, while SM is powerfully effective, and seems to most of us the best method yet devised by mankind, it is made up of two elements which we have already seen are fallible. [...] Again, two fallibilities do not add up to one infallibility. Scientific generalizations which have lasted a long time have high probability, perhaps the highest probability of any generalizations, but it is only Idolatry which claims none of them will ever again have to be revised or rejected. Too many have been revised or rejected in this century alone.

— Robert Anton Wilson, The New Inquisition

Among the concepts covered is the idea of "absolute laws of physics" - he ends up saying that every "law" that has been investigated seemed to be subject to anomalous results from time to time, and that there may be some other parallel universe with absolute laws of physics that are always obeyed, but Wilson has not seen any sign of it around in this one. Wilson draws on a large number of accounts of recorded events said to be "paranormal" but dismissed by materialist science as mass hallucination, e.g. the visions in Fátima, Portugal, and various UFO sightings. He comments that when it comes to 70,000 people having a mass hallucination, it's difficult to see how the explanation is any less occult than the events the explanation purports to explain. "You try it", he writes. "See if by any means you can induce a mass hallucination [...] try, saying, hey, take a look at that light over there brighter than the sun."

The book lists many phenomena that the author claims do not fit neatly into a materialist account of the world, and secondly, the book introduces various interpretations of quantum physics that may or may not provide a ground for explanation. The book concludes with the idea which he claims Schrödinger supported, that the sum total of all minds is one, and that individual brains are best understood as local receivers, of an overall transmission which is always everywhere.

That is my heresy; that is why I cannot buy into fundamentalism. I wonder a bit.

— Robert Anton Wilson,
on being truly skeptical

The author repeatedly says "I am not asking you to believe any of this stuff, I'm just asking you to dispassionately observe your own reaction to these accounts".

== Critical reception ==
Jim Lippard described the quality of research in the book as "very shoddy". The book had a large number of typographical errors. He also said that Wilson's message about avoiding dogmatism was worthwhile, that the book was entertaining but that readers should be careful about taking Wilsons' explanations seriously. Lippard listed inaccuracies about the Esperanza Stone, fish falling from the sky and the alleged Mars effect.

Kristin Buxton compared Wilson to Martin Gardner, noting that Gardner has written on many of the topics that Wilson writes about in the book, taking very different points of view. She pointed out that Gardner does not think it is easy to exactly define pseudoscience, nor does Gardner think his ideas are infallible. She mentioned that other reviewers had pointed out problems with the research and that the book needs to be read with care. She concluded with suggesting a merging of the views of Robert Anton Wilson and Martin Gardner as a possible new approach to science.

Scientist Carl Sagan criticized Wilson's characterizing people skeptical of the phenomena he relates as an "inquisition" in his book The Demon-Haunted World, writing: "Wilson... describes skeptics as a 'new inquisition.' But to my knowledge no skeptic compels belief. Indeed, on most TV documentaries and talk shows, skeptics get short shrift and almost no air time. All that's happening is that some doctrines and methods are being criticized-at the worst, ridiculed-in magazines like The Skeptical Inquirer with circulations of a few tens of thousands. New Agers are not much, as in earlier times, being called up before criminal tribunals, nor whipped for having visions, and they are certainly not being burned at the stake. Why fear a little criticism? Aren't they interested to see how their beliefs hold up against the best counterarguments skeptics can muster?"

== Editions ==
Alternative cover design
- Robert Anton Wilson, The New Inquisition: Irrational Rationalism and the Citadel of Science. 1986. 240 pages.
- Robert Anton Wilson, The New Inquisition: Irrational Rationalism and the Citadel of Science. 1994. 256 pages.
- Robert Anton Wilson, The New Inquisition: Irrational Rationalism and the Citadel of Science. Second Edition 2020. Hilaritas Press. 323 pages. ISBN 978-1-7344735-4-4
