= The Earth Will Shake =

The Earth Will Shake may mean:

- The Earth Will Shake, the first novel in Robert Anton Wilson's The Historical Illuminatus Chronicles
- "The Earth Will Shake," a song on Thrice's album Vheissu
