= Consent (disambiguation) =

Consent is defined as when one person voluntarily agrees to the proposal or desires of another. Consent may also refer to:

== Types of consent ==
- Informed consent, obtaining subject approval for medical procedures
- Sexual consent, voluntary agreement to engage in sexual acts
  - Consent in BDSM, consent as it relates to BDSM

== Criminal defense ==
- Consent (criminal law), a defense against criminal liability

== Films ==
- Consent, a 2004 short film by Jason Reitman
- Consent: The Louise Nicholas Story, a 2014 New Zealand TV film directed by Robert Sarkies
- Consent (2023 British film), a 2023 British TV film made for Channel 4
- Consent (2023 French film), a 2023 French film by Vanessa Filho

=== Other uses ===
- Consent (play), a 2017 play by Nina Raine
- Consent (roleplaying), how much control a player has over their character in a role-playing game

== See also ==
- Consensus (disambiguation)
- Consentement (disambiguation) (French: Consent)
