= The Sex Magicians =

1973 novel by Robert Anton Wilson

- Author: Robert Anton Wilson
- Language: English
- Genre: counterculture, erotica, fantasy
- Publisher: Sheffield House
- Publication date: 1973
- Publication place: United States
- Pages: 195

The Sex Magicians is the first novel by Robert Anton Wilson, released in 1973. It revolves around the goings-on at the Orgasm Research Foundation. The Illuminati take a major role in its plot; its main protagonists are Josie Welch and Dr. Roger Prong.

The book was long out-of-print until a new edition was published by Hilaritas Press in 2024. Portions of it were recycled into sex-scenes in Wilson's later Schrödinger's Cat Trilogy. The character Markoff Chaney reappears in The Illuminatus! Trilogy as well as Schrödinger's Cat Trilogy, an extended version of his introduction is reused in the former one.

This work also incorporates various other plot points found in Wilson's later works, such as the Fernando Poo crisis.

Although The Sex Magicians predates The Illuminatus! Trilogy based on its publication date, it remains unclear if the actual contents of The Sex Magicians were written before or during the writing process of The Illuminatus! Trilogy. Given the significant amount of time it took to find a publisher for Illuminatus, it is possible that its content was actually reused in The Sex Magicians, rather than the other way around. Illuminatus! was published in 1975, and it took five years for its author to get published. Being published in 1973, The Sex Magicians may have content reused from Illuminatus! while the latter was waiting to be published. It is possible that The Sex Magicians paved the way for Illuminatus! to be published.

The book is very pornographic, with numerous hardcore scenes. However, the author also developed the logics of sex magic underlying the seemingly gruesome sexual scenes.
