= Post-irony =

State in which earnest and ironic intents become muddled

Post-irony is a term used to denote a state in which earnest and ironic intents become muddled, or alternatively to describe a return from irony to earnestness, similar to new sincerity.

In literature, David Foster Wallace is often described as the founder of a "postironic" literature. His essays "E Unibus Pluram" and "Fictional Futures and the Conspicuously Young" describe and hope for a literature that goes beyond postmodern irony. Other authors often described as postironic are Dave Eggers, Tao Lin, and Alex Shakar.

== Overview ==
Whereas in postmodern irony, something is meant to be cynically mocked and not taken seriously, and in new sincerity, something is meant to be taken seriously or "unironically", post-irony combines these two elements by either having something absurd taken seriously or be unclear as to whether something is meant to be ironic.

One example given is the film Bad Lieutenant: Port of Call New Orleans:

The film contains what a Snakes on a Plane-style irony-fest should: hokey plot, bad acting, and deliciously over-the-top glorification of sex and drug use. But the film does much more than revel in its genre's campy history—The Bad Lieutenant is gorgeously shot and contains pervasive, incisive commentary on everything from race relations to police corruption and the definition of finding success in America.

— Matthew Collins, The Georgetown Voice

A central element of post-irony is the obfuscation, ambiguity, watering-down, degradation, or simple lack of meaning and intent in statements and artwork, and whether the creator or disseminator intends this to be celebrated, decried, or met apathetically can itself be part of this uncertainty. As journalist Dmitry Lisovsky writes, "Post-ironic memes [...] don't even have to be of great quality: I once took 10 random pictures from a few post-ironic meme communities and shuffled the captions between them. Users had a hard time telling the difference between the new ones and those that came before." Post-irony, "meta-irony", and the often vague deconstruction and reconstruction of irony in general, are common elements in millennial and zoomer humor. Post-irony has been stated to be utilized in internet memes to spread disinformation and as a tool to radicalize people into extremist communities, especially relating to the American alt-right and related movements.

== Criticism ==
In 2003, Zoe Williams described the increasing popularity of the term with disapproval:

...there are a number of misconceptions about irony that are peculiar to recent times....the eighth is that "post-ironic" is an acceptable term – it is very modish to use this, as if to suggest one of three things: i) that irony has ended; ii) that postmodernism and irony are interchangeable, and can be conflated into one handy word; or iii) that we are more ironic than we used to be, and therefore need to add a prefix suggesting even greater ironic distance than irony on its own can supply. None of these things is true.

— Zoe Williams, The Guardian

== See also ==
- Absurdism
- Dog whistle (politics)
- Gaslighting
- Guerrilla ontology
- Metamodernism
- Poe's Law
- Independent film
