= Eight-circuit model of consciousness =

Philosophical concept by Timothy Leary

The eight-circuit model of consciousness is a holistic model originally presented as psychological philosophy (abbreviated "psy-phi") by Timothy Leary. The model posits eight circuits, or eight systems or "brains", as referred by other authors, which operate within the human nervous system. Each corresponds to its own imprint and subjective experience of reality.

The theory was introduced by Leary in books including Neurologic (1973) and Exo-Psychology (1977), later expanded on by Robert Anton Wilson in his books Cosmic Trigger (1977) and Prometheus Rising (1983), and by Antero Alli in his books Angel Tech (1985) and The Eight-Circuit Brain (2009), that suggests "eight periods [circuits]" within the model. Leary and Alli include three stages for each circuit, detailing developmental points for each level of consciousness.

The model has been criticized as lacking scientific credibility and had been largely been ignored in academia. (Note: Kaiser, David; McCray, W. Patrick, eds. (2016). "Timothy Leary's transhumanist SMI^2LE". Groovy Science. pp. 238–262. "A once-promising researcher who abandoned the protocols of mainstream psychology for notoriety... / Neuropolitics and Exo-Psychology were clear signs that Leary had strayed far from O'Neill's comparatively straightforward ideas, which were grounded in optimistic yet measured extrapolations of 1970s technology. It's difficult to determine exactly how people responded to Leary's two books. Contemporary responses were relatively rare and memories today are hazy. / Leary incorporated another fringy ingredient besides space settlements and drug-enhanced mental capacity into his formulation for SMI^2LE. / Was Leary's SMI^2LE program an example of 1970s 'groovy science'? Can we even call it 'scientific'? Leary presented few technical details, provided no blueprints for its realization, and shrouded his ideas in cryptic references to quantum fields and neurological circuits of consciousness. [...] In these ways, he differs sharply from 'visioneers' like O'Neill who grounded their ideas about the technological future on detailed engineering studies and who published and occasionally presented research in professional scientific venues. / Leary's ideas tapped into a potpourri of fringe sciences, including est, quantum consciousness, space habitation, and other topics that spanned physics, psychology, and the paranormal.") (Note: Cultural historian John Higgs states that Leary hoped to rebuild his academic reputation by pivoting away from psychedelics and toward speculation on human evolution, but that "[this] attempt at scientific credibility was doomed to fail, partly because he was the infamous Timothy Leary and his reputation would always tower over him, but mainly because it simply isn't good science to create a theoretical model and claim that it represents different things at the same time. This thinking was, essentially, occult or mystical, and would never be taken seriously by the establishment." Higgs 2006, pp. 236–237)

== Background and Development ==
In the late 1960s and early 1970s, Leary formulated what became his eight-circuit model of consciousness in collaboration with writer Brian Barritt. The essay "The Seven Tongues of God" claimed that human brains have seven circuits producing seven levels of consciousness. This later became seven circuits in Leary's 1973 monograph Neurologic, which he wrote while he was in prison. The eight-circuit idea was not exhaustively formulated until the publication of Exo-Psychology by Leary and Robert Anton Wilson's Cosmic Trigger in 1977. Wilson contributed to the model after befriending Leary in the early 1970s, and used it as a framework for further exposition in his book Prometheus Rising, among other works. (Note: Wilson 1992, p. 6: "The eight-circuit model of consciousness in this book and much of its future-vision derive from the writings of Dr. Timothy Leary, whose letters and conversations have also influenced many other ideas herein.")

Recent publications include 2025's 8-Circuit Ascension: A Guide to Metaprogramming the Multidimensional Self written by Drs. Douglas S. Wingate and Rachel Turetzky, which updates the model with current research in neuroscience and psychedelic research. Additionally, Wingate and Turetzky co-authored an accompanying workbook, 8-Circuit Ascension Workbook: Tools to Change Your Brain & Increase Intelligence (2026). Exploring the Eight-Circuit Model of Consciousness: A Pathway to Enhanced Mind-Body Health is the first peer-reviewed academic journal article written on the eight-circuit model of consciousness, co-authored by Kasian, Turetzky, and Wingate (2025)..

== Overview ==
Of the eight circuits in this model of consciousness, the first four circuits concern themselves with life on Earth, and the survival of the human species. The last four circuits are post-terrestrial, and concern themselves with the evolution of the human species as represented by so-called altered states of consciousness, enlightenment, mystical experiences, psychedelic states of mind, and psychic abilities. The proposal suggests that these altered states of consciousness are recently realized, but not widely utilized. Leary described the first four as "larval circuits", necessary for surviving and functioning in a terrestrial human society, and proposed that the post terrestrial circuits will be useful for future humans who, through a predetermined script, continue to act on their urge to migrate to outer space and live extra-terrestrially. Leary, Wilson, and Alli have written about the idea in depth, and have explored and attempted to define how each circuit operates, both in the lives of individual people and in societies and civilizations.

1. The Oral Bio-Survival Circuit
2. The Anal Emotional-Territorial Circuit
3. The Time-Binding Semantic Circuit
4. The “Moral” Socio-Sexual Circuit
5. The Holistic Neurosomatic Circuit
6. The Collective Neurogenetic Circuit
7. The Meta-programming Circuit
8. The Non-Local Quantum Circuit

The term "circuit" is equated to a metaphor of the brain being computer hardware, and the wiring of the brain as circuitry.

Leary used the eight circuits along with recapitulation theory to explain the evolution of the human species, the personal development of an individual, and the biological evolution of all life.

== See also ==
- Erikson's stages of psychosocial development
- Extended mind thesis
- Integral theory
- List of New Age topics
- Maslow's hierarchy of needs
- Psychedelic experience
- Reality tunnel
