= Consentement =

Consentement (French: Consent), or le consentement, or variation, may refer to:

- "Consentement" (song), a 1999 song by Mylène Farmer off the album Innamoramento
- Le consentement (book), a 1999 book by Carmen Robertson
- Du consentement (book), a 2007 book by Geneviève Fraisse
- Le consentement (film), a 2019 short film by Emmanuel Mouret, released as part of Love Affair(s)
- Le Consentement (book), a 2020 memoir by Vanessa Springora detailing her abusive relationship with Gabriel Matzneff
- Consent (2023 French film) (French: Le Consentement, lit. 'The Consent'), a 2023 French drama film based on the 2020 memoir by Vanessa Springora

== See also ==
- La Prunelle de mes yeux: 1986-1987 (French: Apple of my Eye: 1986-1987), a 1993 memoir by Gabriel Matzneff; an anonymized fictionalized account of his relationship with Vanessa Springora
- Consent (disambiguation)
