= Modus non excipiens =

In logic, modus non excipiens is a valid rule of inference that is closely related to modus ponens. This argument form was created by Bart Verheij to address certain arguments which are types of modus ponens arguments, but must be considered to be invalid. An instance of a particular modus ponens type argument is

A large majority accept A as true. Therefore, there exists a presumption in favor of A.

However, this is an argumentum ad populum, and is not deductively valid. The problem can be addressed by drawing a distinction between two types of inference identified by Verheij:

Modus ponens:

Premises:
- As a rule, if P then Q
- P
Conclusion:
- Q

and

Modus non excipiens

Premises:
- As a rule, if P then Q
- P
- It is not the case that there is an exception to the rule that if P then Q
Conclusion:
- Q
