= Consensus conference (disambiguation) =

Consensus conference often refers to a type of citizens' assembly most common in Denmark.

Consensus conference may also refer to:

- a conference for scientific consensus
- Monterrey Consensus, the outcome of the 2002 Monterrey Conference, the UN International Conference on Financing for Development

== See also ==
- Consensus (disambiguation)
