= Right Where You Are Sitting Now =

1982 book by Robert Anton Wilson

- Author: Robert Anton Wilson
- Language: English
- Subjects: Consciousness, psychology, science
- Publisher: And/Or Press
- Publication date: 1982
- Publication place: United States
- Pages: 208
- ISBN: 0-914171-45-3

Right Where You Are Sitting Now, fully titled Right Where You Are Sitting Now: Further Tales of the Illuminati, is a 1982 book of philosophical writings written by Robert Anton Wilson. Dedicated to William S. Burroughs and Philip K. Dick, this work covers Deadly Nightshade, The Jumping Jesus Phenomenon, The Universe Contains a Maybe, The Junkyard Dog, Is God a Dope? Or Just Plain Clumsy, Have Fun with Your New Head, and many other writings. The 1992 edition contains a new introduction by Timothy Leary.
