= Guerrilla ontology =

Practice in a Robert Anton Wilson book

Guerrilla ontology is a practice described by author Robert Anton Wilson in his 1980 book The Illuminati Papers as "the basic technique of all my books. Ontology is the study of being; the guerrilla approach is to so mix the elements of each book that the reader must decide on each page 'How much of this is real and how much is a put-on?'"

== Practice ==
The goal of guerrilla ontology is to expose an individual or individuals to radically unique ideas, thoughts, and words, in order to invoke cognitive dissonance, which can cause a degree of discomfort in some individuals as they find their belief systems challenged by new concepts.

The ultimate goal of guerrilla ontology is to promote positive brain change and new ways of experiencing and adapting to reality.

== See also ==
- Post-irony
