= Everything Is Under Control =

1998 book by Robert Anton Wilson

Everything Is Under Control: Conspiracies, Cults and Cover-ups
- Author: Robert Anton Wilson and Miriam Joan Hill
- Language: English
- Subject: Conspiracies
- Publisher: Harper
- Publication date: 1998
- Publication place: United States
- Pages: 448
- ISBN: 0062734172
- Text: Everything Is Under Control: Conspiracies, Cults and Cover-ups at Internet Archive

Everything is Under Control: Conspiracies, Cults and Cover-ups is a reference book by Robert Anton Wilson with Miriam Joan Hill, first published by Harper in 1998 in the United States, and by Pan Books in the United Kingdom. Arranged alphabetically, it details various conspiracy theories and the persons and events connected to them.
