= The Sekhmet Hypothesis =

1995 book by Iain Spence

The Sekhmet Hypothesis was first published in book form in 1995 by Iain Spence. It suggested that pop trends of an atavistic nature could be analysed in relation to Dr. Timothy Leary's interpersonal circumplex model. It also suggested that major youth trends could be correlated to peaks in the 11 year solar cycle; this idea was later rejected by the author in 1999.

The hypothesis was published in 1997 in the journal Towards 2012 and covered in 1999 by journalist Steve Beale in Sleazenation magazine.

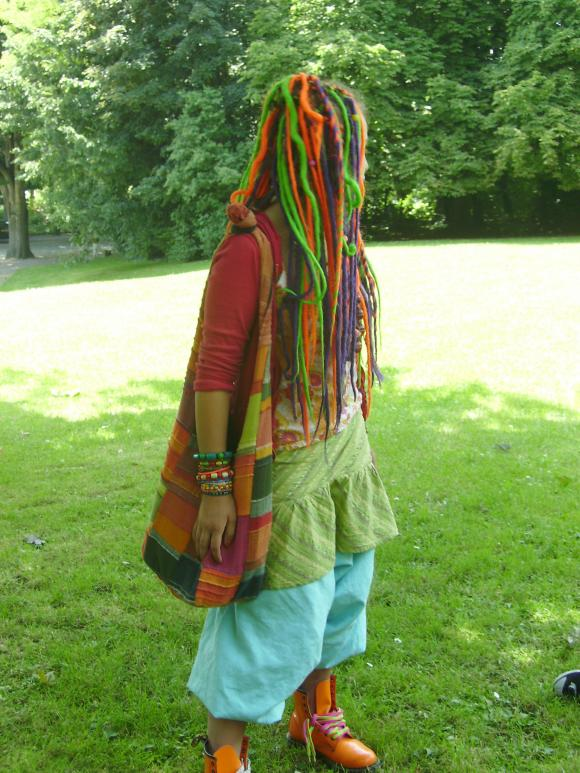
French hippie - the hypothesis suggests that atavistic youth trends can be viewed as recurring archetypal symbols.

== Origins of the hypothesis ==
The origins of the hypothesis can be traced back to Robert Anton Wilson's 1983 book, Prometheus Rising, in which Wilson makes a singular correlation between the symbol of the flower child with the mood of friendly weakness. Spence extended the comment into a study of various youth archetypes and linked in their behaviour to the four atavistic life scripts.

The life scripts relate to each other with the following dialogue:

Friendly Weakness - I'm not okay, you're okay

Hostile Weakness - I'm not okay, you're not okay

Friendly Strength - I'm okay, you're okay

Hostile Strength - I'm okay, you're not okay

A diversified and holistic guide to the four life scripts was first introduced by Dr. Leary and three of his colleagues in 1951. Leary suggested there were balanced, healthy forms of behaviour in relation to each of the life scripts and extreme, unhealthy forms of behaviour in relation to each of the scripts. By the late 1960s psychologists such as Eric Berne, Thomas Harris and Claude Steiner had changed Leary's holistic guide to one which favoured the life position of 'I'm okay, you're okay' over all the other scripts.

== Influence on comic book mythology ==
The author Grant Morrison later incorporated the idea into their Invisibles comic book series (1994–2000) and their New X-Men comic book series (2001–2004). Morrison has discussed their own views on the hypothesis in their book Supergods (2011) citing the topic as an influence on their New X-Men story arc 'Riot at Xavier's'. The story's lead character, Kid Omega, develops hostile strength tendencies which run out of control with dire consequences for his school.

Robert Salkowitz discusses the Sekhmet hypothesis in Comic-Con and the Business of Pop Culture, in which he questions Morrison's take on the hypothesis suggesting instead that the Strauss-Howe generational theory may explain deeper moods within pop culture.

== The four life scripts in relation to atavistic youth trends ==
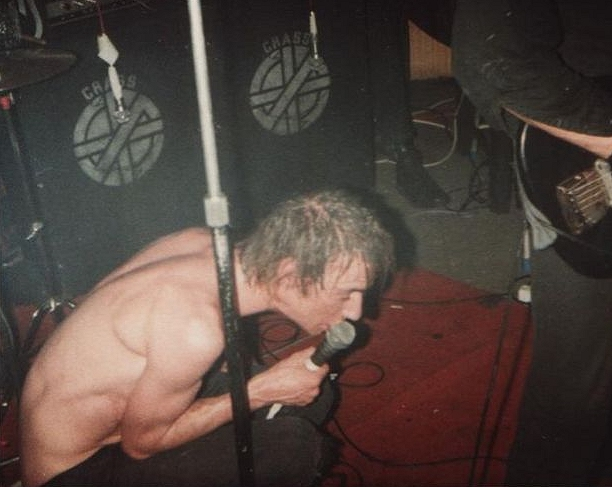
Bilious body language: Crass punk culture, early 1980s.

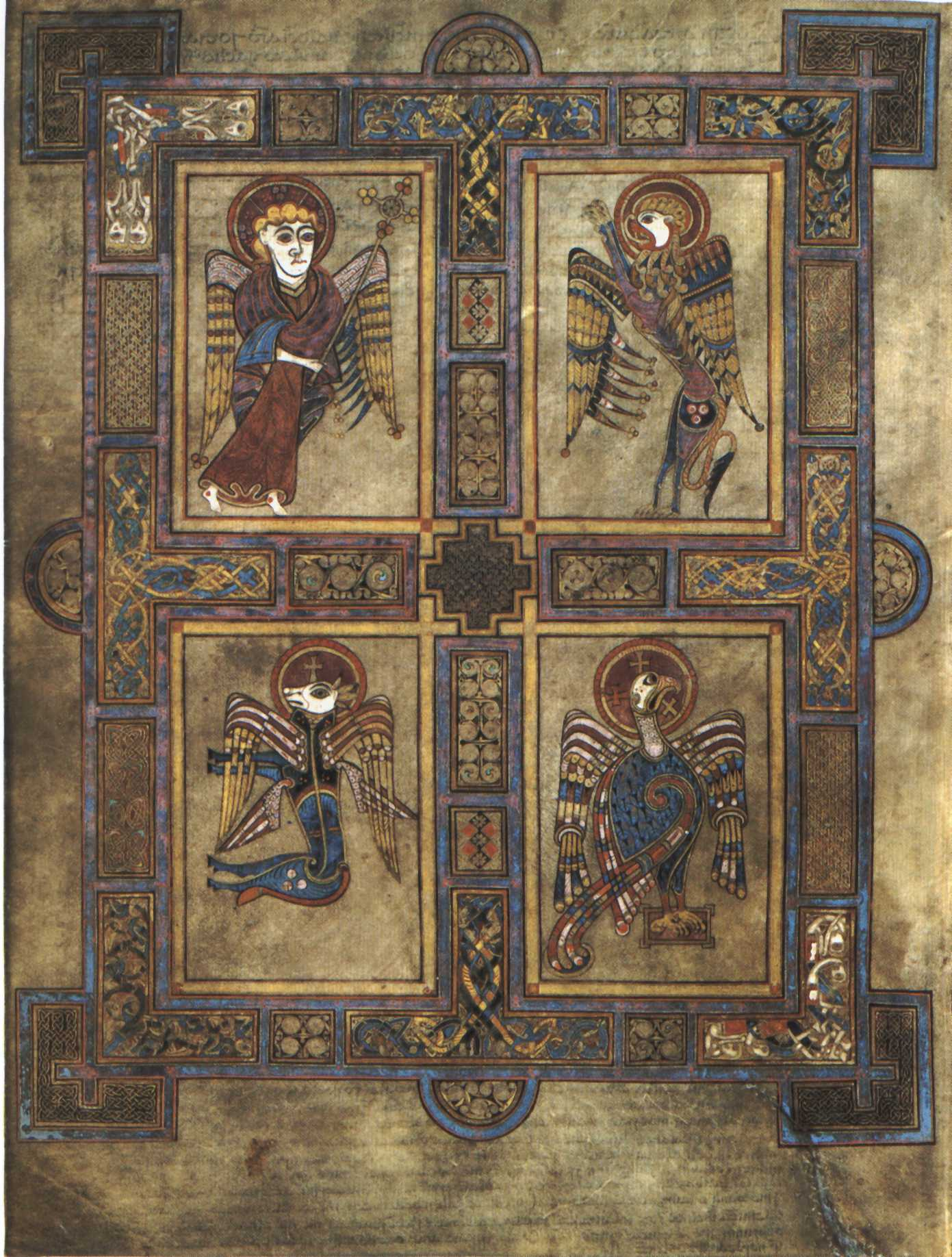
A typical early example of an atavistic quaternity, from the Book of Kells.

The hypothesis suggests that the flower children of the sixties and the mellow side of reggae culture presents a collective mood of "friendly weakness" while punk culture and certain aspects of rap culture present an archetype of 'hostile weakness'. In the late eighties and nineties, rave culture along with early drum and bass supposedly presents a mood based mainly on 'friendly strength'. The hypothesis suggests that most people are not hard wired to any particular life script and likewise young people are generally fluid enough to move between different pop trends with ease and some humour. Grunge for example is viewed as an atavistic hybrid, drawing on elements of both punk and hippie culture.

The social symbolism of the hypothesis is also compared to the archetypal symbolism of Ezekiel's quaternity in the Christian Bible. Ezekiel is said to have had a vision of the winged man (angel), the bull, the lion and the eagle. The same quaternity was later incorporated into illuminated manuscripts such as the Book of Kells. Spence has corresponded flower power and late reggae culture (Bob Marley, cannabis use, dub, dreadlocks) to the gentle angel; the rebellious mood of early rap and punk culture to the sullen bull and the leonine strength of drum and bass and rave culture to the proud lion.

Grant Morrison and Iain Spence have split views on the subject of hostile strength played out through youth culture. Morrison suggests that the trend has come and gone with the film The Matrix (1999) along with commanding symbolism in the nu metal scene. Spence meanwhile suggests that the mood has emerged through the more commanding aspects of hip hop, gabber and metal sub-cultures.

== The sequential integration of the life scripts ==
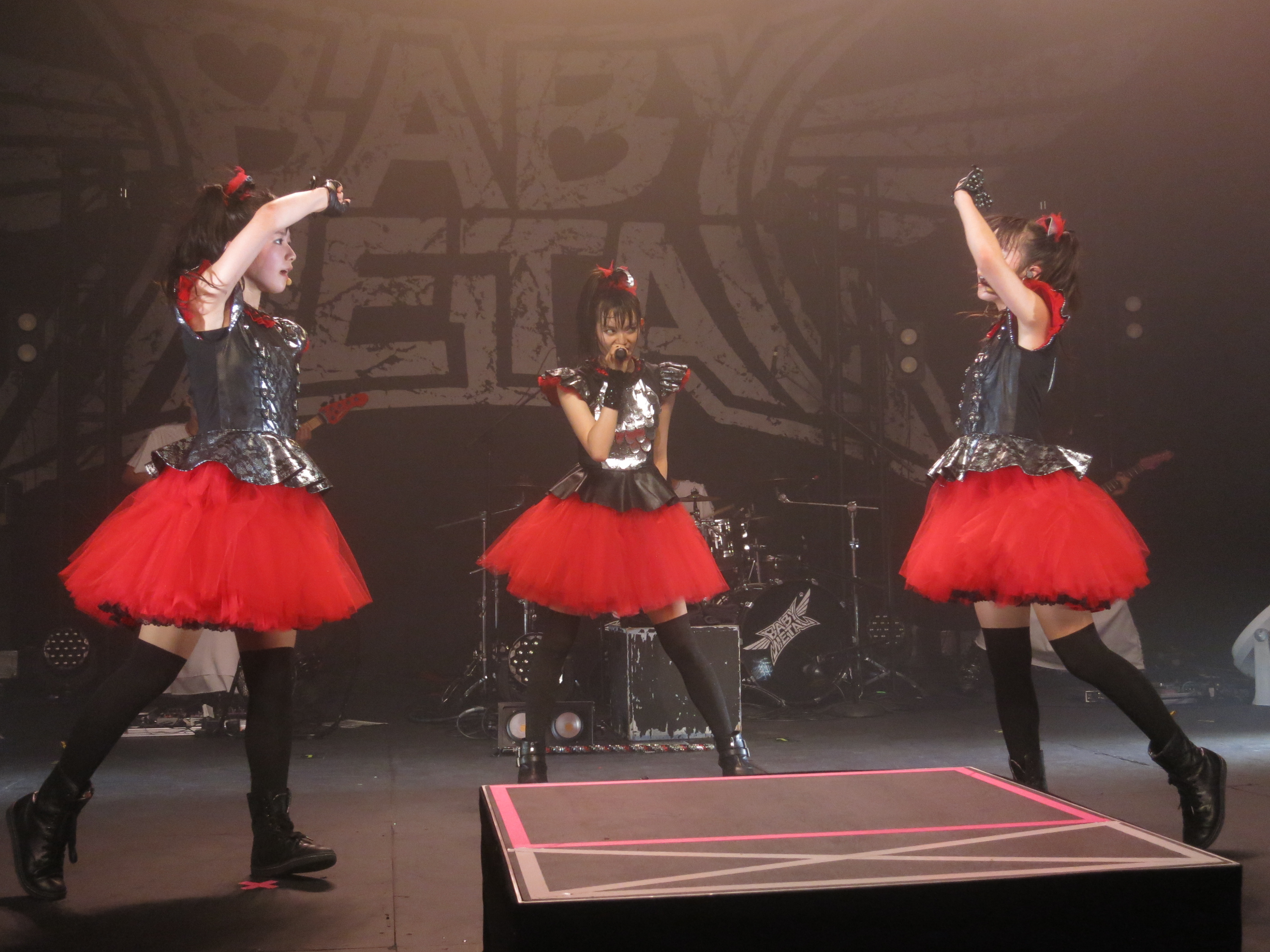
Babymetal - playful commanding symbolism within Pop Metal culture.

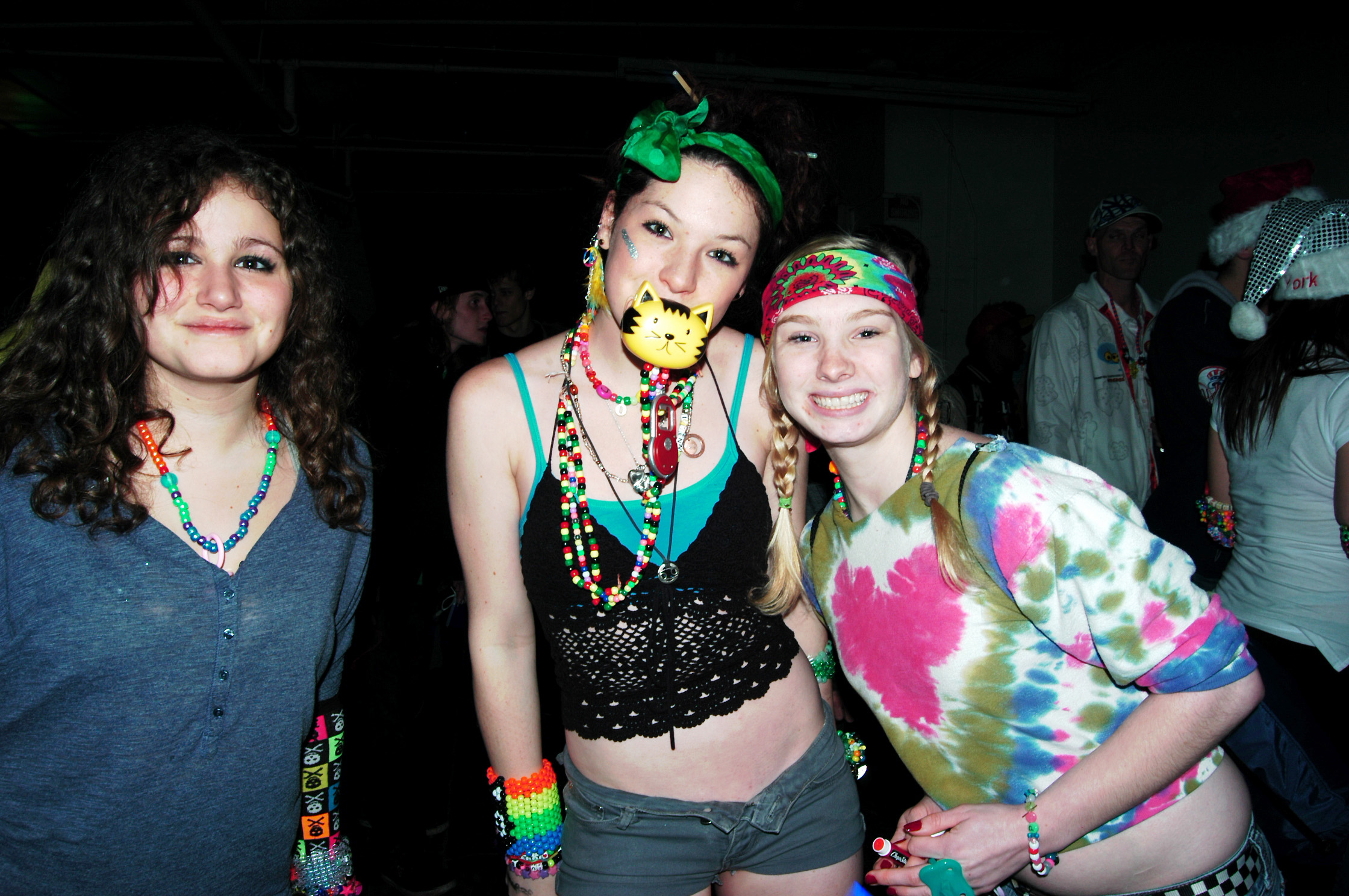
Ravers 2010 - wearing children's "kandy" beads, along with teething symbolism.

The hypothesis suggests that teenagers recapitulate infancy and childhood through pop culture. This self-referencing process supposedly leads to the manifestation of social symbols. Spence proposes that the life scripts start in infancy from the state of friendly weakness, an idea already proposed by Thomas Harris in his book, I'm OK, You're OK in 1970.

Thomas Harris had split from Eric Berne's view that the scripts start from the stage of Friendly Strength. There is still some argument as to the sequence and timing of the scripts. Spence has proposed the life scripts are integrated in the sequence of friendly weakness (at birth), hostile weakness (infancy), friendly strength and then lastly the commanding behaviour of hostile strength, some time in late childhood. Unlike Harris and Berne, Spence argues that hostile strength does not have to be "demonised or criminalised" as a mood, claiming that it is only one part of a balanced quaternity of behaviour. In this respect he has returned to Leary's view of approaching the life scripts from a holistic perspective. Timothy Leary himself has also commented on the relationship between infancy and atavistic pop trends. Other writers such as Jon Savage have applied the same view to punk culture. Spence also draws on children's fiction to illustrate the "four timeless scripts" referring for example to the four main characters in The Wind in the Willows and the four children in The Polar Express.

== The Hare Hypothesis ==
By 2000 Spence had rejected any solar links to the hypothesis suggesting it might best be treated as a psychological puzzle or game. He rewrote a web-site version of his ideas as, The Hare Hypothesis in a move to keep the hypothesis playful and devoid of any solar connection. Grant Morrison revived the original solar link in 2011 in their book Supergods but didn't offer any scientific evidence in support of their views.
