= Michael Romkey =

American horror writer

Michael Romkey is an American horror writer known primarily for vampire novels. His first book, Fears Point, was released in 1989.

== Novels ==
- Fears Point (1989) ISBN 0-449-14601-4
- I, Vampire (1990)
- The Vampire Papers (1994)
- The Vampire Princess (1995)
- The Vampire Virus (1997)
- Vampire Hunter (1998)
- The London Vampire Panic (2001)
- The Vampire's Violin (2003)
- American Gothic (2004)
- Telluride Blood (2016)
