= Cosmic Trigger trilogy =

Book series by Robert Anton Wilson

- 1978 edition of the first book
- Cosmic Trigger I: The Final Secret of the Illuminati; Cosmic Trigger II: Down to Earth; Cosmic Trigger III: My Life After Death
- Author: Robert Anton Wilson
- Country: United States
- Language: English
- Discipline: Linguistics, consciousness, psychology
- Publisher: And/Or; New Falcon Publications; Hilaritas Press
- Published: 1977–1995
- No. of books: 3

The Cosmic Trigger trilogy is a three-volume autobiographical and philosophical work by Robert Anton Wilson. The first volume of the series was published in 1977, initially published without numbering, as the second volume did not appear for nearly 15 years. The third and final volume was published in 1995. Wilson is perhaps best known as the co-author of the award-winning science fiction work The Illuminatus! Trilogy. Cosmic Trigger revisits many of the themes from that earlier work in a more autobiographical fashion.

== Summary ==
=== The Final Secret of The Illuminati ===
Cosmic Trigger I deals with Wilson's experiences during a time in which he put himself through a process of "self-induced brain change" as well as vignettes of his earlier life. The main discovery of this process—which, he tells us, is known in certain traditions as Chapel perilous—is that "reality" (although a noun in most Indo-European language systems, and therefore commonly conceptualized as being a definite, unchanging "thing") is mutable and subjective to the observer. It has a foreword by Timothy Leary, which he wrote in the summer of 1977.

Wilson employs several models for his experiences, such as the interstellar ESP connection, during which time Wilson enters what he refers to as a "reality tunnel", in which he claims to communicate telepathically with extraterrestrials residing in the Sirius star system. Wilson states however, that this belief system does not necessarily have any objective truth, which highlights his main point: that all such models—whether spiritual or scientific—are just that: models, or maps, of the world, and they should not be confused with an objective, permanent reality. Throughout the book, he makes references to specific paranormal personal and group experiences, yet he does not allow himself to become convinced of their reality apart from his perception of them. He calls this approach "model agnosticism".

The book also deals with the Bavarian Illuminati conspiracy (which Wilson neither rejects as utterly false nor embraces as true, in keeping with his theme) and other related intrigues. The work also touches on a wide range of other subjects, from Timothy Leary's thoughts on brain circuits and JFK's assassination, through to Sufism and numerous occult practises.

=== Down to Earth ===
First published in 1991, Cosmic Trigger II continues where Cosmic Trigger I: The Final Secret of the Illuminati left off, as well as being a set piece in itself. Wilson continues the Illuminati-based synchronicities that have taken place since Cosmic Trigger I was first published. The book is an exploration into the future of cyberspace; the peculiarities of Irish jurisprudence; links to the Mafia, the CIA and the Catholic Church; anal-eroticism in the White House; the Dog Castrator of Palm Springs and more. The book combines humour, twists in logic and zen-like koans to get its messages across.

The book is made up of ninety-four short chapters, with the main themes interwoven throughout in a non-linear fashion. In part, this volume of the series outlines Wilson's intellectual development, from his religious education under the ('sadistic') nuns at Catholic school, through to his materialist-atheistic standpoint as an engineering student, and his eventual development of the "model agnosticism" which shapes much of his published work. Along the way he discusses becoming a Trotskyist when he was seventeen, and his time as an Objectivist, while under the influence of the work of Ayn Rand.

Other recurring themes relate to conspiracies, involving the Vatican and allegedly freemasonic societies such as P2. He discusses the controversial death of Roberto Calvi; who was known in some quarters of the press as "God's Banker" because of his ties to the Vatican Bank. Elsewhere, a plethora of other topics are touched upon, including Aleister Crowleyean magick ritual, Wilson's love of movies, virtual reality, Jungian Synchronicity, and the exponential growth of global information. Wilson wrote the book while the first Gulf War was in progress, and the dedication at the beginning of the book announces that the work is against the "makers of war". Accordingly, many of the chapters feature anti-war quotes beneath the chapter titles, from figures ranging from William Tecumseh Sherman to Peter Ustinov, as well as more general quotes relating to concepts such as government and the social construction of reality, from people such as Oscar Wilde and H.L. Mencken.

=== My Life After Death ===
Cosmic Trigger III, published in 1995, delivers observations about the widespread (and premature) announcement of his demise, along with synchronicities, religious fanatics, UFOs, crop circles, paranoia, pompous scientists, secret societies, high tech, black magic, quantum physics, hoaxes (real and fake), Orson Welles, James Joyce, Carl Sagan, Madonna, and the vagina of Nuit.

The third volume in Wilson's Cosmic Trigger series begins with an analysis of a faked internet news story announcing the author's death, in February 1994. Wilson discusses this with his usual humor, and then uses it as a springboard into philosophical meditation on broader issues relating to the nature of "truth" and existential questions about death and reality. Indeed, much of the book is concerned with the mutability of reality; the different layers or "masks" of experience, in a Nietzschean sense. Wilson uses the example of Elmyr, the art forger, to explore issues such as authenticity and consensus reality. Another key figure throughout is Orson Welles. Wilson comments on the techniques Welles used in his films, relating their effects to the relativistic conceptualization of reality that Wilson associates with the use of marijuana.

He also carries on his examination of information density and its move "steadily westward", which he touched upon in the second volume of the series. In this regard, and elsewhere in the book, Wilson embraces the ideas and philosophy of R. Buckminster Fuller.

Other concepts explored are postmodernism and political correctness; and he use the example of militant feminism to demonstrate how dogmatic adherence to any belief system can result in intolerant and even dangerous ideologies, suggesting that dogmatic and extreme feminism has made androphobia acceptable (he uses the term "androphobia" in reference to the fear/hatred of all men on ideological grounds, rather than in the psychological sense). Although this argument could be construed by some as sexist, it is made clear that he is in agreement with the basic aims of traditional and mainstream feminism (i.e. the equality of women and men) and he only opposes the most extreme strains of feminism, and he also states that he is in agreement with many of the goals of political correctness, yet opposes the "fascist" tactics used by some of its adherents to force its ideals on people.

Other topics include LSD, science fiction writer Philip K. Dick, and the potential pitfalls of blindly accepting "expert" opinion; all loosely connected by the underlying theme of the perspectival and relative construction of reality.

== Publication history ==
Cosmic Trigger I was originally published by And/Or with Simon and Schuster in 1977 with an introduction by Timothy Leary. It was later republished by New Falcon Publications. The second book was published in 1991, and the third in 1995.

A new edition, edited and with a new introduction by John Higgs, was published by Hilaritas Press on February 23, 2016. Hilaritas Press is the new publishing house created by the Robert Anton Wilson Trust.

== Analysis and reception ==
In their obituary of Wilson, The New York Times described the series as a "bizarre autobiography" in which Wilson "describes episodes when he believed he had communicated with extraterrestrials — while admitting that he was experimenting with peyote and mescaline." One commentator suggested that the series allowed one to retrace "the scripts whose sometimes striking recombination shaped [Wilson's] experience."

== Stage adaptation ==
Cosmic Trigger
- Original language: English
- Written by: Daisy Campbell
- Based on: Cosmic Trigger I: The Final Secret of the Illuminati by Robert Anton Wilson

Premiere
- Date: 22 November 2014
- Place: Camp and Furnace, Liverpool
- Official website

Cosmic Trigger has been adapted as a theatrical stage play by Daisy Campbell, daughter of Ken Campbell the British theatre maverick who staged Illuminatus! at the Royal National Theatre in 1977. The new play opened on 23 November 2014 in Liverpool before transferring to London and Brighton. Some of the costs were met through crowdfunding. Wilson's book is itself dedicated to "Ken Campbell and the Science-Fiction Theatre of Liverpool, England."

The play's script was published in 2021 by Hilaritas Press as a paperback and ebook, under the title of Cosmic Trigger the Play. Along with the play-text, the book features an introduction by Ben Graham as well as colour photographs from the stage show.
