= Consensus reality =

Notion of reality based on consensus view

Consensus reality is the generally agreed-upon version of reality within a community or society, shaped by shared experiences and understandings. This understanding arises from the inherent differences in individual perspectives or subjectivities relating to knowledge or ontology, leading to uncertainties about what is real. While various viewpoints exist, people strive to establish a consensus, serving as a pragmatic guide for social norms. The term carries both positive and negative connotations, as it is viewed critically by anti-realist theorists but recognized for its practical benefits in fostering shared beliefs. Consensus reality differs from consensual reality, with the former representing mutual agreement about what is true. Artists and thinkers have challenged consensus reality, aiming to disrupt established norms and question the authenticity of the world's reality.

Children are sometimes viewed as inexperienced with consensus reality, though with the expectation that their perspective will progressively move closer to the consensus reality of their society as they age.

== General discussion ==
In considering the nature of reality, two broad approaches exist: the realist approach, in which there is a single, objective, overall reality believed to exist irrespective of the perceptions of any given individual, and the idealistic approach, in which it is considered that an individual can verify nothing except their own experience of the world, and can never directly know the truth of the world independent of that.

Berger and Luckmann argue that "reality is socially constructed and that the sociology of knowledge must analyze the process in which this occurs". Rather than being a purely philosophical topic, the question of reality includes, for them, the sociological study of consensus reality.

Consider this example: consensus reality for people who follow a particular theocentric religion is different from consensus reality for those who follow another theocentric religion, or from those that eschew theocentric religions in favor of science alone, for explaining life and the universe.

In societies where theocentric religions are dominant, the religious understanding of existence would be the consensus reality. In a predominantly secular society, where the consensus reality is grounded in science alone, the religious worldview would be the non-consensus (or alternative) reality.

In this way, different individuals and communities have fundamentally different world views, with fundamentally different comprehensions of the world around them, and of the constructs within which they live. Thus, a society that is, for example, completely secular and one which believes every eventuality to be subject to metaphysical influence will have very different consensus realities, and many of their beliefs on broad issues such as science, slavery, and human sacrifice may differ in direct consequence of the differences in the perceived nature of the world they live in.

Charles Tart in his book The Awakening proposed an alternative term – "conditioned reality" (conditioned or conditional reality), pointing out the inaccuracy of the term "consensus reality", since no one asks an individual for consent whether he wants to live in a "generally accepted reality", because he is accustomed to it through "conditioning" – the development of conditioned reflexes in the process of education and socialization.

== In science and philosophy ==
=== Idealists ===
Some idealists (subjective idealists) hold the view that there isn't one particular way things are, but rather that each person's personal reality is unique. Such idealists have the world view which says that we each create our own reality, and while most people may be in general agreement (consensus) about what reality is like, they might live in a different (or nonconsensus) reality.

=== Materialists ===
Materialists may not accept the idea of there being different possible realities for different people, rather than different beliefs about one reality. So for them only the first usage of the term reality would make sense. To them, someone believing otherwise, where the facts have been properly established, might be considered delusional.

== Social consequences ==
=== Views on the term ===
The connotation of the term "consensus reality" is usually disparaging: it is usually employed by idealist, surrealist and other anti-realist theorists opposing or hostile to this "reality," with the implication that this consensus reality is, to a greater or lesser extent, created by those who experience it. (The phrase "consensus reality" may be used more loosely to refer to any generally accepted set of beliefs.) However, there are those who use the term approvingly for the practical benefits of all agreeing on a common set of assumptions or experiences.

=== Consensus vs. consensual reality ===
Consensus reality is related to, but distinct from, consensual reality. The difference between these terms is that whereas consensus reality describes a state of mutual agreement about what is true (consensus is a noun), consensual reality describes a type of agreement about what is true (consensual is an adjective). In other words, reality may also be non-consensual, as when one person's preferred version of reality conflicts with another person's preferred version of reality. Consensual reality is relevant to understanding a variety of social phenomena, such as deception.

=== Social aspects ===
Artists, writers, and theorists have attempted to oppose or undermine consensus reality while others have declared that they are "ignoring" it. For example, Salvador Dalí intended by his paranoiac-critical method to "systematize confusion thanks to a paranoia and active process of thought and so assist in discrediting completely the world of reality".

== See also ==
- Brute fact
- Common knowledge
- Common misconception
- Consensus theory of truth
- Derealization
- Hyperreality
- Intersubjectivity
- Map-territory relation
- Naïve physics
- Pragmatism
- Reality tunnel
- Reality-based community
- Red pill and blue pill
- Simulated reality
- Social construction
- Social constructionism
- Tinkerbell effect
- Truthiness
- Wikiality
- 2 + 2 = 5 (George Orwell)
