= Schrödinger's Cat Trilogy =

Novels by Robert Anton Wilson

- Cover of the Dell collected edition
- Author: Robert Anton Wilson
- Language: English
- Genre: Fantasy, science fiction
- Published: 1988 (Dell Publishing)
- Publication place: United States
- Pages: 560
- ISBN: 978-0-440-50070-4

The Schrödinger's Cat Trilogy is a trilogy of novels by American writer Robert Anton Wilson consisting of Schrödinger's Cat: The Universe Next Door (1979), Schrödinger's Cat II: The Trick Top Hat (1980), and Schrödinger's Cat III: The Homing Pigeons (1981), each illustrating a different interpretation of quantum physics. They were collected into an omnibus edition in 1988.

Wilson is also co-author of The Illuminatus! Trilogy (1975), and Schrödinger's Cat is a sequel of sorts, re-using several of the same characters and carrying on many of the themes of the earlier work.

The name Schrödinger's Cat comes from a thought experiment in quantum mechanics. The first book, The Universe Next Door, takes place in different universes in accord with the many worlds interpretation of quantum physics; in the second, The Trick Top Hat, characters are unknowingly connected through non-locality, i.e., having once crossed paths they are joined in quantum entanglement; and the third book, The Homing Pigeons, places characters in an "observer-created universe" in which consciousness causes the collapse of the wavefunction.

Taking place in Unistat, which is the novel's parallel to the United States, the novels have intertwining plots involving a wide array of characters, including:

- Epicene Wildeblood, a.k.a. Mary Margaret Wildeblood, a transsexual woman who throws great parties
- Frank Dashwood, president of Orgasm Research
- Markoff Chaney, a prankster
- Hugh Crane, a.k.a. Cagliostro the Great, a mystic and magician
- Furbish Lousewart V, author and President of Unistat
- Marvin Gardens, author and cocaine addict
- Eve Hubbard, scientist and alternate President of Unistat

== Series summary ==
In The Universe Next Door, the President of Unistat is Furbish Lousewart V; in that universe, a terrorist organization known as Purity of Essence (named after General Ripper's obsession in the film Dr. Strangelove) threatens to detonate nuclear devices in major cities all over Unistat. Also mirroring Dr. Strangelove, Unistat has an automated device that will send nuclear missiles to Russia in the event of such an attack. Russia has a similar device to bomb China, and so on.

In The Trick Top Hat, President Hubbard, promotes a scientific approach to the improvement of life: she offers rewards to anyone who can design a robot to do their job or develop methods to prolong life. Eventually Unistat becomes a Utopia. She makes the whole law system into three different laws: victimless crimes, which have no punishment; crimes against property, which involve debt and payment; and serious crimes, such as murder, which result in being sent to Hell, a place like jail but not quite. It's encased in laser shielding and is like a primitive world all its own. It is, in fact, the State of Mississippi. The original Pocket Books edition of The Trick Top Hat contains many passages, some sexually explicit, that are not included in later editions, including the Dell softcover. Much of this material first appeared in Wilson's earlier novel, The Sex Magicians, published as pornography by Sheffield House in 1973.

The third volume, The Homing Pigeons, features President Kennedy, although it has very little to do with the President. Near the end of the book it keeps switching universes, some of which contain President Kennedy, others which contain President Lousewort, and still others in which Hubbard is the president. Like The Trick Top Hat, The Homing Pigeons also has material in the Pocket Books edition that is not in later editions. Unlike The Trick Top Hat, however, the material that was cut out did not contain particularly sexually explicit content.

The main plots throughout these books are many. One follows Markoff Chaney, a midget, and his pranks played on the world that continuously screws him over. Most of his pranks are played on Dr. Dashwood, of Orgasm Research. However, the most important plot line follows the path of one Hugh Crane which may or may not be this Universe's Hagbard Celine; a character that is an obvious representation of Wilson himself.

Another follows an "Ithyphallic Eidolon", a penis removed from a transsexual woman named Epicene (post-surgery, Mary Margaret) Wildebloode. She puts it on display on her mantelpiece, where it gets stolen. It passes through the vicinity of almost every character in the series at least once.

There are dozens of conspiracy theories, strange loops, satire and paranoia included within those pages. In addition, there are numerous references to other works and occasional outright appropriation of characters from them (including cameos by Captain Ahab and Lemuel Gulliver, among others). Many of the character names are either puns ("Bertha van Ation," referring to the 1915 film The Birth of a Nation, "Juan Tootrego") or references to historical personages (Blake Williams refers to the poet William Blake, Francis Dashwood's name refers to Sir Francis Dashwood).

== Tanstagi ==
"Tanstagi", an acronym standing for "There Ain't No Such Thing As Government Interference", is the motto of the Invisible Hand Society, an originally fictional organization invented in the Schrödinger's Cat Trilogy. The acronym was deliberately intended as a reference to Robert A. Heinlein's TANSTAAFL principle.

The Tanstagi principle is meant to imply that the invisible hand of the free market applies to government as well. In other words, contrary to traditional ideas of laissez-faire capitalism, government interference in the free market is impossible, since governments are inextricably a part of the market as a whole. 'Government' is not a separate institution—it is a word used to describe the actions of a large number of individuals subject to the same (at least qualitatively) pressures as everyone else. Both of these ideas are part of what is known as 'economic Taoism.'

While it was first introduced in a novel, people claiming to be members or know of chapters of the Invisible Hand Society have occasionally appeared in editorial pages and on the Internet.

== Language and invented slang ==
The Schrödinger's Cat Trilogy is a fictional story, with much interpersonal dialogue between characters. This dialogue frequently makes use of slang words invented by the author, as a substitute for words that were, in the 1970s, typically taboo to speak about in modern western culture. In case a censorship case was brought against the book, Wilson made use of the names of Supreme Court Justices as "stand ins" for certain words. Examples include "Potter Stewarting", an expression used as a substitute for a common word that refers to the act of copulation, and "Burgering", referring to the act of voiding one's bowels (referring to Chief Justice of the United States from 1969 to 1986, Warren E. Burger), etc.

== Reception ==
Greg Costikyan reviewed Schrödinger's Cat in Ares Magazine #2 and commented that "It deals with uncertainty, sub-nuclear physics; Oriental philosophy, violence, sex and nuclear war. If this description seems confusing to you, you will be more confused after reading the novel. Purchase it; you will either love it or despise it."

Greg Costikyan reviewed Schrodinger's Cat II: The Trick Top Hat in Ares Magazine #10 and commented that "Wilson is not a writer for the unware; the Schrodinger's Cat series is immensely enjoyable, but requires a reader who will think. Aficionados of space opera need not apply."

Greg Costikyan reviewed Schrodinger's Cat III: The Homing Pigeons in Ares Magazine #11 and commented that "Schrodinger's Cat III proves once again that Wilson is one of the best and most interesting writers of whom science fiction can boast."

== Publication details ==
- Wilson, Robert (1988). Schrodinger's Cat Trilogy. New York: Dell Publishing. ISBN 0-440-50070-2. Previously published in three separate volumes by Pocket Books.
