= Masks of the Illuminati =

Novel by Robert Anton Wilson

- 1990 paperback edition
- Author: Robert Anton Wilson
- Language: English
- Genre: science fiction
- Published: 1981 (Dell Publishing)
- Publication place: United States
- Media type: Print (hardback & paperback)
- ISBN: 0-440-50306-X (1990 edition)
- OCLC: 21615729

Masks of the Illuminati is a 1981 novel by Robert Anton Wilson, co-author of The Illuminatus! Trilogy and over thirty other influential books. Although not a sequel to the earlier work, it does expand information on many of the topics referred to in the trilogy.

== Plot summary ==
The novel features numerous real-life historical figures in its narrative, including a first person description of reality by scientist Albert Einstein and Irish author James Joyce, while the plot involves English author and occultist Aleister Crowley, British nobles, the Loch Ness Monster and mystical experiences.

The plot revolves primarily around the description by a young English gentleman, Sir John Babcock, of his initiation into the Argenteum Astrum. Ancestors of Sir John are major characters in The Historical Illuminatus Chronicles.

== Reception ==
Greg Costikyan reviewed Masks of the Illuminati in Ares Magazine #9 and commented that "Masks of the Illuminati is an essentially minor work by a master, but for all of that makes amusing and thoughtful reading. Those unacquainted with Wilson's work would do well to pick up a copy."

== Reviews ==
- Review by Theodore Sturgeon (1981) in Rod Serling's The Twilight Zone Magazine, September 1981
- Review by Tom Easton (1981) in Analog Science Fiction/Science Fact, December 7, 1981
