= Consensus theory of truth =

Concept in epistemology

A consensus theory of truth is the process of taking statements to be true simply because people generally agree upon them.

== Varieties of consensus ==
=== Consensus gentium ===
An ancient criterion of truth, the consensus gentium (Latin for agreement of the people), states "that which is universal among men carries the weight of truth" (Ferm, 64). A number of consensus theories of truth are based on variations of this principle. In some criteria the notion of universal consent is taken strictly, while others qualify the terms of consensus in various ways. There are versions of consensus theory in which the specific population weighing in on a given question, the proportion of the population required for consent, and the period of time needed to declare consensus vary from the classical norm.

=== Consensus as a regulative ideal ===
A descriptive theory is one that tells how things are, while a normative theory tells how things ought to be. Expressed in practical terms, a normative theory, more properly called a policy, tells agents how they ought to act. A policy can be an absolute imperative, telling agents how they ought to act in any case, or it can be a contingent directive, telling agents how they ought

== Critiques ==
It is very difficult to find any philosopher of note who asserts a bare, naive, or pure consensus theory of truth, in other words, a treatment of truth that is based on actual consensus in an actual community without further qualification. One obvious critique is that not everyone agrees to consensus theory, implying that it may not be true by its own criteria. Another problem is defining how we know that consensus is achieved without falling prey to an infinite regress. Even if everyone agrees to a particular proposition, we may not know that it is true until everyone agrees that everyone agrees to it. Bare consensus theories are frequent topics of discussion, however, evidently because they serve the function of reference points for the discussion of alternative theories.

If consensus equals truth, then truth can be made by forcing or organizing a consensus, rather than being discovered through experiment or observation, or existing separately from consensus. The principles of mathematics also do not hold under consensus truth because mathematical propositions build on each other. If the consensus declared 2+2=5 it would render the practice of mathematics where 2+2=4 impossible.

Imre Lakatos characterizes it as a "watered down" form of provable truth propounded by some sociologists of knowledge, particularly Thomas Kuhn and Michael Polanyi.

Philosopher Nigel Warburton argues that the truth by consensus process is not reliable, general agreement upon something does not make it true. Warburton says that one reason for the unreliability of the consensus theory of truth, is that people are gullible, easily misled, and prone to wishful thinking—they believe an assertion and espouse it as truth in the face of overwhelming evidence and facts to the contrary, simply because they wish that things were so.

== See also ==
- Argumentum ad populum – Fallacy of claiming the majority is always correct
- Circular reasoning – Logical fallacy in which the conclusion provides the premise
- Coherentism – Type of epistemology
- Common knowledge – Statement widely known to be true
- Confirmation holism – Idea in the philosophy of science
- Consensus reality – Notion of reality based on consensus view
- Conventional wisdom – Generally accepted ideas
- Jury trial – Type of legal trial
- Mandela effect – False memories shared by many people
- Mass hysteria – Spread of illness without organic cause
- Philosophy of history § History as propaganda: Is history always written by the victors?
- Philosophy of history – Philosophical study of history and its discipline
- Truthiness – Belief in truth based on only intuition
- Wikiality – Neologism combining Wiki and reality

=== Related topics ===
- Belief – Subjective attitude that something is true
- Conventionalism – Philosophical belief that principles depend on societal agreements, not external reality
- Epistemology – Philosophical study of knowledge
- Information – Facts provided or learned about something or someone
- Inquiry – Type of investigation
- Knowledge – Awareness of facts, or competency
- Pragmatism – Philosophical tradition
- Pragmaticism – Branch of pragmatic philosophy
- Pragmatic maxim – Maxim of logic formulated by Charles Sanders Peirce
- Reproducibility – Aspect of scientific research
- Scientific method – Interplay between observation, experiment, and theory in science
- Testability – Ability to examine a theory by experimentation
- Verifiability theory of meaning – Philosophical doctrine

== Sources ==
- Ferm, Vergilius (1962), "Consensus Gentium", p. 64 in Runes (1962).
- Haack, Susan (1993), Evidence and Inquiry: Towards Reconstruction in Epistemology, Blackwell Publishers, Oxford, UK.
- Habermas, Jürgen (1976), "What Is Universal Pragmatics?", 1st published, "Was heißt Universalpragmatik?", Sprachpragmatik und Philosophie, Karl-Otto Apel (ed.), Suhrkamp Verlag, Frankfurt am Main. Reprinted, pp. 1–68 in Jürgen Habermas, Communication and the Evolution of Society, Thomas McCarthy (trans.), Beacon Press, Boston, Massachusetts, 1979.
- Habermas, Jürgen (1979), Communication and the Evolution of Society, Thomas McCarthy (trans.), Beacon Press, Boston, Massachusetts.
- Habermas, Jürgen (1990), Moral Consciousness and Communicative Action, Christian Lenhardt and Shierry Weber Nicholsen (trans.), Thomas McCarthy (intro.), MIT Press, Cambridge, Massachusetts.
- Habermas, Jürgen (2003), Truth and Justification, Barbara Fultner (trans.), MIT Press, Cambridge, Massachusetts.
- James, William (1907), Pragmatism, A New Name for Some Old Ways of Thinking, Popular Lectures on Philosophy, Longmans, Green, and Company, New York, New York.
- James, William (1909), The Meaning of Truth, A Sequel to 'Pragmatism', Longmans, Green, and Company, New York, New York.
- Kant, Immanuel (1800), Introduction to Logic. Reprinted, Thomas Kingsmill Abbott (trans.), Dennis Sweet (intro.), Barnes and Noble, New York, New York, 2005.
- Kirkham, Richard L. (1992), Theories of Truth: A Critical Introduction, MIT Press, Cambridge, Massachusetts.
- Rescher, Nicholas (1995), Pluralism: Against the Demand for Consensus, Oxford University Press, Oxford, UK.
- Runes, Dagobert D. (ed., 1962), Dictionary of Philosophy, Littlefield, Adams, and Company, Totowa, New Jersey.
