= Prometheus Rising =

1983 book by Robert Anton Wilson

- Author: Robert Anton Wilson
- Cover artist: Stan Slaughter
- Language: English
- Genre: New age; Occult; Self-help
- Publisher: New Falcon
- Publication date: July 1983
- Publication place: United States
- Media type: Print (Paperback)
- Pages: 262
- ISBN: 1-56184-056-4
- Dewey Decimal: 133
- LC Class: AC8 .W719 1983

Prometheus Rising is a 1983 guidebook by Robert Anton Wilson. The book includes explanations of Timothy Leary's eight-circuit model of consciousness, Alfred Korzybski's general semantics, Aleister Crowley's Thelema, and various other topics related to self-improvement, occult traditions, and pseudoscience. In the introduction written by Israel Regardie, Wilson's purpose for writing the book is given as unleashing humanity's "full stature".

== Production ==
The book examines many aspects of social mind control and mental imprinting, and provides mind exercises at the end of every chapter, with the goal of giving the reader more control over how one's mind works. The book has found many readers among followers of alternative culture, and discusses the effect of certain psychoactive substances and how these affect the brain, tantric breathing techniques, and other methods and holistic approaches to expanding consciousness. It draws a parallel between the development of one's mind and the development of higher intelligence theorized by biological evolution.

Prometheus Rising was published in 1983, but it began as Wilson's 1979 doctoral thesis while a student at Paideia University titled "The Evolution of Neuro-Sociological Circuits: A Contribution to the Sociobiology of Consciousness". In 1982, while in Ireland, Wilson rewrote the manuscript, removing footnotes, improving the style, adding chapters, exercises, and diagrams and illustrations. An introduction by Israel Regardie was included.

== Influence on other works ==
A brief comment made by Wilson in the book became the main seed thought for The Sekhmet Hypothesis. Wilson suggested that the gentle angel symbol from Ezekiel in the Bible had its modern correlation with the flower child of the Sixties. The author of The Sekhmet Hypothesis, Iain Spence, went on to compare Ezekiel's other symbols to various pop cultural trends. In Prometheus Rising, Wilson compared the four Life Positions of Transactional Analysis to the four main Life Positions presented in Timothy Leary's earlier interpersonal circumplex grid. Spence favored Leary's model and used it to describe the moods of atavistic pop culture.

Prometheus Rising is listed as one of the ten seminal works of extropian thought in the Extropianism FAQ. It was also listed on Max More's reading list for extropians, the Immortality Institute's reading list in The Scientific Conquest of Death, and other reading lists for extropians and transhumans.
