= The Historical Illuminatus Chronicles =

Novel by Robert Anton Wilson

The Historical Illuminatus Chronicles is a series of three novels by Robert Anton Wilson written after his highly successful The Illuminatus! Trilogy and his 1981 Masks of the Illuminati. His co-author from the first trilogy, Robert Shea, was not involved in this series, providing only a praising blurb.

It is composed of three books: The Earth Will Shake (1982) ISBN 1-56184-162-5, The Widow's Son (1985) ISBN 1-56184-163-3, and Nature's God (1991) ISBN 1-56184-164-1. A fourth book, The World Turned Upside Down, was promised at the end of Nature's God but was never written; Wilson also had stated he intended the Chronicles to be a pentalogy. His death in 2007 left the series as a trilogy, incomplete. There is an audiobook of the first novel read by Scott Crisp.

== Plot summary ==
The novels concern the adventures of Sigismundo Celine, an ancestor of the Hagbard Celine character in the Illuminatus! Trilogy, as he blunders through Europe and America during the Enlightenment, constantly fighting to escape becoming a part of history.

In the first book, Sigismundo is an adolescent in Naples, Italy, where his uncle introduces him to the teaching of the Freemasons. In the second book Sigismundo has been banished from Naples because of a lovers' duel. He lives in Paris and is taken captive twice. The first time he is imprisoned in the Bastille, from which he escapes using Masonic techniques of concentration to help distract himself from the pain involved in climbing down from his tower. The second time Sigismundo is imprisoned by a more mysterious group of captors, who seek to convince him that he is a descendant of Jesus Christ. In the third book, Sigismundo finds himself in further exile, in the wilderness of North America.

== Kenneth Lamar Noid incident ==
In 1989, Kenneth Lamar Noid, a mentally ill man, held two employees at a Domino's Pizza restaurant in Chamblee, Georgia hostage, and requested a copy of the series' second novel, The Widow's Son. In an interview between Wilson and James Wallis of ESTWeb, Wallis mentioned "someone held up a fast-food restaurant demanding $100,000, a helicopter and a copy of The Widow's Son." Wilson showed familiarity with the case.
