= Robert Anton Wilson =

American writer and futurist (1932–2007)

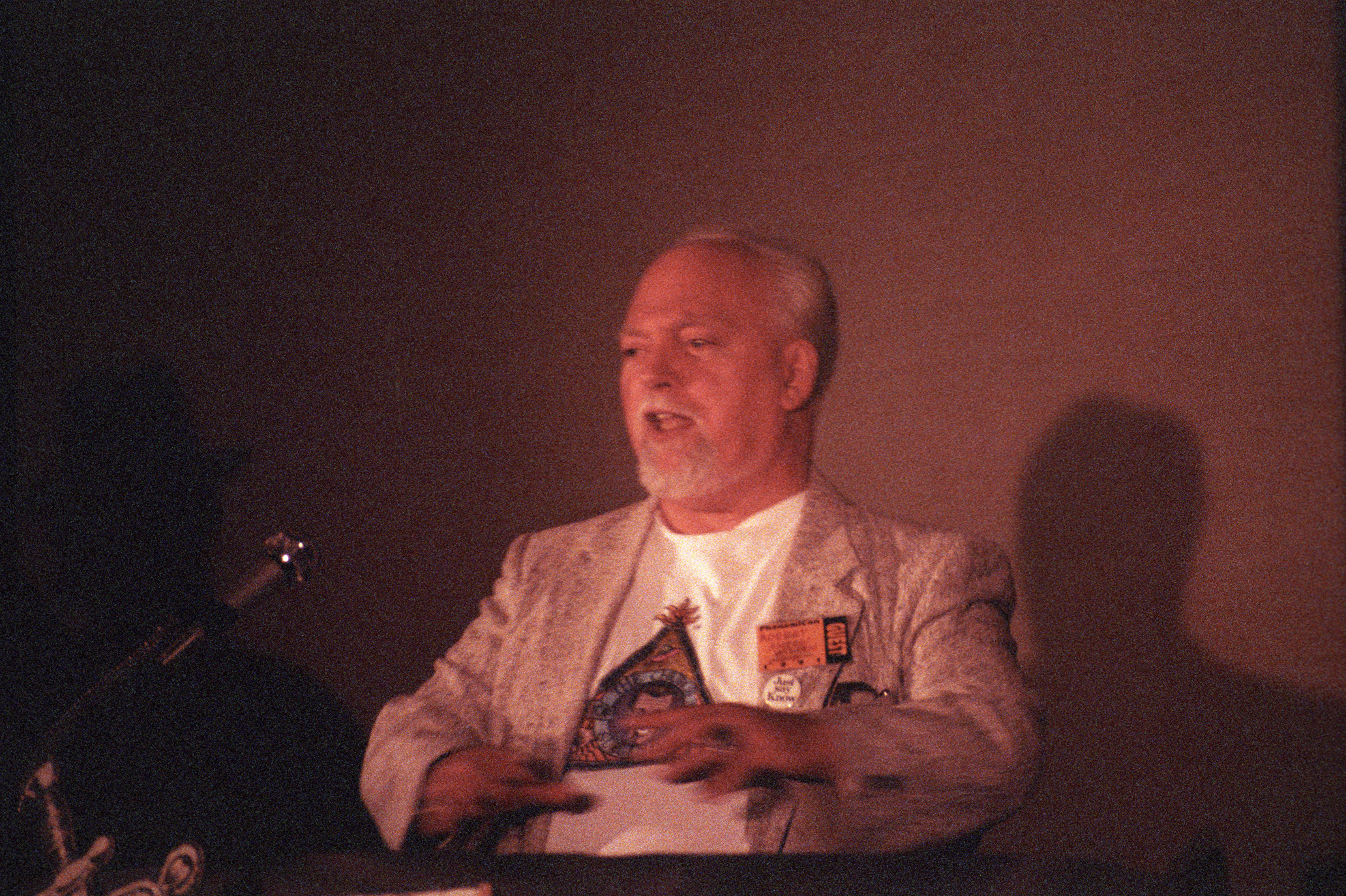
- Wilson in 1991
- Born: Robert Edward Wilson; January 18, 1932; Brooklyn, New York, U.S.
- Died: January 11, 2007 (aged 74); Capitola, California, U.S.
- Occupations: Writer, lecturer
- Spouse: Arlen Riley Wilson (m. 1958; died 1999)

Education
- Education: Paideia University (MA, PhD)

Philosophical work
- Era: 20th-century philosophy 21st-century philosophy
- Region: Western philosophy: American philosophy
- School: Agnosticism; Discordianism; Libertarian socialism
- Main interests: Conspiracy theories; futurology; mysticism; paranormality; politics; psychology; religion
- Notable works: The Illuminatus! Trilogy (1975); Schrödinger's Cat Trilogy (1979); Masks of the Illuminati (1981); The Historical Illuminatus Chronicles (1982); Prometheus Rising (1983); Quantum Psychology (1990)
- Notable ideas: 23 enigma; Celine's laws; Eight-circuit model of consciousness; Guerilla ontology; Reality tunnel

Robert Anton Wilson (born Robert Edward Wilson; January 18, 1932 – January 11, 2007) was an American writer, futurist, psychologist, and self-described agnostic mystic. Recognized within Discordianism as an Episkopos, pope and saint, Wilson helped publicize Discordianism through his writings and interviews. In 1999 he described his work as an "attempt to break down conditioned associations, to look at the world in a new way, with many models recognized as models or maps, and no one model elevated to the truth". Wilson's goal was "to try to get people into a state of generalized agnosticism, not agnosticism about God alone but agnosticism about everything."

In addition to writing several science-fiction novels, Wilson also wrote non-fiction books on extrasensory perception, mental telepathy, metaphysics, paranormal experiences, conspiracy theory, sex, drugs, and what Wilson called "quantum psychology".

Following a career in journalism and as an editor, notably for Playboy, Wilson emerged as a countercultural figure in the mid-1970s, alongside one of his coauthors, Timothy Leary, as well as Terence McKenna.

== Life ==
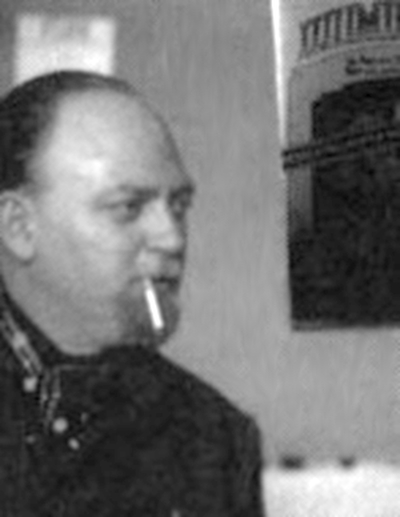
Wilson at the National Theatre, London, for the 10-hour stage version of Illuminatus! in 1977

Born Robert Edward Wilson in Methodist Hospital, in Brooklyn, New York, he spent his first years in Flatbush, and moved with his family to Gerritsen Beach, in a lower middle class area, around the age of four or five, where they stayed until relocating to the then-socioeconomically analogous South Slope section (in part to facilitate an easier high school commute for Wilson) when he was thirteen. He had polio as a child, and found generally effective treatment with the Kenny Method (created by Elizabeth Kenny) which the American Medical Association repudiated at that time. Polio's effects remained with Wilson throughout his life, usually manifesting as minor muscle spasms causing him to occasionally use a cane, until 2000, when he experienced a major bout with post-polio syndrome that would continue until his death.

He attended Catholic grammar schools before securing admission to the selective Brooklyn Technical High School. Removed from the Catholic influence at "Brooklyn Tech", Wilson became enamored of literary modernism (particularly Ezra Pound and James Joyce), the Western philosophical tradition, then-innovative historians such as Charles A. Beard, science fiction (including the works of Olaf Stapledon, Robert A. Heinlein and Theodore Sturgeon) and Alfred Korzybski's interdisciplinary theory of general semantics. He would later recall that the family was "living so well ... compared to the Depression" during this period "that I imagined we were lace-curtain Irish at last."

Following his graduation in 1950, Wilson was employed in a succession of jobs (including ambulance driver, engineering aide, salesman and medical orderly) and absorbed various philosophers and cultural practices (including bebop, psychoanalysis, Friedrich Nietzsche, Alfred Korzybski, James Joyce, Bertrand Russell, Carl Jung, Wilhelm Reich, Leon Trotsky, and Ayn Rand, whom he later repudiated) while writing in his spare time. He studied electrical engineering and mathematics intermittently at the Brooklyn Polytechnic Institute from 1952 to 1957 before enrolling in an English education undergraduate program at New York University from 1957 to 1958 but did not complete a degree at either institution.

After having smoked cannabis for nearly a decade, Wilson first experimented with mescaline in Yellow Springs, Ohio, on December 28, 1961. Wilson began to work as a freelance journalist and advertising copywriter in the late 1950s. He adopted his maternal grandfather's name, Anton, for his writings and told himself that he would save the "Edward" for when he wrote the Great American Novel. He later found that "Robert Anton Wilson" had become an established identity.

He assumed co-editorship of the School for Living's Brookville, Ohio-based Balanced Living magazine in 1962 and briefly returned to New York as associate editor of Ralph Ginzburg's quarterly magazine, called fact:, before leaving for Playboy, where he served as an associate editor from 1965 to 1971. According to Wilson, Playboy "paid me a higher salary than any other magazine at which I had worked and never expected me to become a conformist or sell my soul in return. I enjoyed my years in the Bunny Empire. I only resigned when I reached 40 and felt I could not live with myself if I didn't make an effort to write full-time at last." Along with frequent collaborator Robert Shea, Wilson edited the magazine's Playboy Forum, a letters section consisting of responses to the Playboy Philosophy editorial column. During this period, he covered Timothy Leary and Richard Alpert's Millbrook, New York-based Castalia Foundation at the instigation of Alan Watts in The Realist, cultivated important friendships with William S. Burroughs and Allen Ginsberg, and lectured at the Free University of New York on 'Anarchist and Synergetic Politics' in 1965.

He received a BA, MA (1978) and PhD (1981) in psychology from Paideia University, which was an accredited university in California at the time he graduated in 1981 but later on became unaccredited and then closed. Wilson reworked his dissertation, and it found publication in 1983 as Prometheus Rising.

Wilson married freelance writer and poet Arlen Riley in 1958. They had four children, including Christina Sophia Pearson and Patricia Luna Wilson. Luna was beaten to death in an apparent robbery in the store where she worked in 1976 at the age of 15, and became the first person to have her brain preserved by the American Cryonics Society (which was called the Bay Area Cryonics Society at the time). Arlen Riley Wilson died on May 22, 1999, following a series of strokes.

== Works ==
=== The Illuminatus! Trilogy ===
Richard Metzger: You have studied the Illuminati for years. Have you come to any conclusion about their aims?

Robert Anton Wilson: Usually when people ask me that question, I give them some kind of a put-on, but I can't think of a good and original put-on that I haven't done several times before. So I'll tell you the truth, for once. After investigating the Illuminati and their critics for the last 30 years, I think the Illuminati was a short lived society of free thinkers and democratic reformers that formed a secret society within Freemasonry, using Freemasonry as a cover so they could plot to overthrow all the kings in Europe and the Pope. I'm very happy that they succeeded in overthrowing all the kings, I just wish that they had completed the job and gotten rid of the Royal family in England too, but they did pretty well on the continent. I'm sorry they haven't finished off the Pope yet, either, but I think they're still working on the project and I wish them luck.

— Disinformation: The Interviews, by Richard Metzger

Among Wilson's 35 books and many other works, perhaps his best-known volumes remain the cult classic series The Illuminatus! Trilogy (1975), co-authored with Shea. Advertised as "a fairy tale for paranoids", the three books—The Eye in the Pyramid, The Golden Apple, and Leviathan, soon offered as a single volume—philosophically and humorously examined, among many other themes, occult and magical symbolism and history, the counterculture of the 1960s, secret societies, data concerning author H. P. Lovecraft and author and occultist Aleister Crowley, and American paranoia about conspiracies and conspiracy theories. The book was intended to poke fun at the conspiratorial frame of mind.

Wilson and Shea derived much of the odder material from letters sent to Playboy magazine while they worked as the editors of its Forum. The books mixed true information with imaginative fiction to engage the reader in what Wilson called "guerrilla ontology", which he apparently referred to as "Operation Mindfuck" in Illuminatus! The trilogy also outlined a set of libertarian and anarchist axioms known as Celine's laws (named after Hagbard Celine, a character in Illuminatus!), concepts Wilson revisited several times in other writings.

Among the many subplots of Illuminatus! one addresses biological warfare and the overriding of the United States Bill of Rights, another gives a detailed account of the John F. Kennedy assassination (in which no fewer than five snipers, all working for different causes, prepare to shoot Kennedy), and the book's climax occurs at a rock concert where the audience collectively face the danger of becoming a mass human sacrifice.

Illuminatus! popularized Discordianism and the use of the term "fnord". It incorporates experimental prose styles influenced by writers such as William S. Burroughs, James Joyce, and Ezra Pound. Although Shea and Wilson never co-operated on such a scale again, Wilson continued to expand upon the themes of the Illuminatus! books throughout his writing career. Most of his later fiction contains cross-over characters from The Sex Magicians (Wilson's first novel, written before the release of Illuminatus!, which includes many of his same characters) and The Illuminatus! Trilogy.

Illuminatus! won the Prometheus Hall of Fame award for Best Classic Fiction, voted by the Libertarian Futurist Society for science fiction in 1986, has many international editions, and found adaptation for the stage when Ken Campbell produced it as a ten-hour drama. It also appeared as two card-based games from Steve Jackson Games, one a trading-card game (Illuminati: New World Order). Eye N Apple Productions and Rip Off Press produced a comic-book version of the trilogy.

=== Schrödinger's Cat Trilogy, The Historical Illuminatus Chronicles, and Masks of the Illuminati ===
Wilson wrote two more popular fiction series. The first, a trilogy later published as a single volume, was Schrödinger's Cat. The second, The Historical Illuminatus Chronicles, appeared as three books. In between publishing the two trilogies Wilson released a stand-alone novel, Masks of the Illuminati (1981), which, due to the main character's ancestry, fits into the timeline of The Historical Illuminatus Chronicles and, while published earlier, may qualify as the fourth volume in that series.

Schrödinger's Cat consists of three volumes: The Universe Next Door, The Trick Top Hat, and The Homing Pigeons. Wilson set the three books in differing alternative universes, in which the cast of characters remains almost the same aside from variations in names, careers and background stories. The books cover the fields of quantum mechanics and the varied philosophies and explanations that exist within the science. The single volume describes itself as a magical textbook and a type of initiation. The single-volume edition omits many entire pages and has many other omissions when compared with the original separate books.

The Historical Illuminatus Chronicles, composed of The Earth Will Shake (1982), The Widow's Son (1985), and Nature's God (1991), follows the timelines of several characters through different generations, time periods, and countries. The books cover a range of topics, including (but not limited to) the history, legacy, and rituals of the Illuminati and related groups.

Masks of the Illuminati features historical characters in a fictionalized setting, and contains a blend of occult history. Intermixing Albert Einstein, James Joyce, Aleister Crowley, Sigmund Freud, Carl Jung, Vladimir Ilyich Lenin, and others, the book focuses on Pan as well as other occult icons, ideas, and practices. It also includes homages, parodies and pastiches from both the lives and works of Crowley and Joyce.

=== Plays and screenplays ===
Wilson's play, Wilhelm Reich in Hell, was published as a book in 1987 and first performed at the Edmund Burke Theatre in Dublin, in San Francisco, and in Los Angeles. It features many factual and fictional characters, including Marilyn Monroe, Uncle Sam, and Wilhelm Reich himself. Wilson also wrote and published as books two screenplays, not yet produced: Reality Is What You Can Get Away With: an Illustrated Screenplay (1992) and The Walls Came Tumbling Down (1997).

Wilson's book Cosmic Trigger I: The Final Secret of the Illuminati has been adapted as a theatrical stage play by Daisy Eris Campbell, daughter of Ken Campbell the British theatre maverick who staged Illuminatus! at the Royal National Theatre in 1977. The play opened on November 23, 2014, in Liverpool before transferring to London and Brighton. Some of the costs were met through crowdfunding. Wilson's book is itself dedicated to "Ken Campbell and the Science-Fiction Theatre Of Liverpool, England."

=== The Cosmic Trigger series and other books ===
In his nonfiction and partly autobiographical Cosmic Trigger I: The Final Secret of the Illuminati (1977) and its two sequels, as well as in many other works, Wilson examined Freemasons, Discordianism, Sufism, the Illuminati, Futurology, Zen Buddhism, Dennis and Terence McKenna, Jack Parsons, the occult practices of Aleister Crowley and G.I. Gurdjieff, Yoga, and many other esoteric or counterculture philosophies, personalities, and occurrences.

Wilson advocated Timothy Leary's 8-Circuit Model of Consciousness and neurosomatic/linguistic engineering, which he wrote about in many books including Prometheus Rising (1983, revised 1997) and Quantum Psychology (1990), which contain practical techniques intended to help the reader break free of one's reality tunnels. With Leary, he helped promote the futurist ideas of space migration, intelligence increase, and life extension, which they combined to form the word symbol SMI²LE.

Wilson's 1986 book, The New Inquisition, argues that whatever reality consists of it actually would seem much weirder than we commonly imagine. It cites, among other sources, Bell's theorem and Alain Aspect's experimental proof of Bell's to suggest that mainstream science has a strong materialist bias, and that in fact modern physics may have already disproved materialist metaphysics.

Wilson also supported the work and utopian theories of Buckminster Fuller and examined the theories of Charles Fort. He and Loren Coleman became friends, as he did with media theorist Marshall McLuhan and Neuro Linguistic Programming co-founder Richard Bandler, with whom he taught workshops. He also admired James Joyce, and wrote extensive commentaries on the author and on two of Joyce's novels, Finnegans Wake and Ulysses, in his 1988 book Coincidance: A Head Test.

Although Wilson often lampooned and criticized some New Age beliefs, bookstores specializing in New Age material often sell his books. Wilson, a well-known author in occult and Neo-Pagan circles, used Aleister Crowley as a main character in his 1981 novel Masks of the Illuminati, also included some elements of H. P. Lovecraft's work in his novels, and at times claimed to have perceived encounters with magical "entities" (when asked whether these entities seemed "real", he answered they seemed "real enough", although "not as real as the IRS" but "easier to get rid of", and later decided that his experiences may have emerged from "just my right brain hemisphere talking to my left"). He warned against beginners using occult practice, since to rush into such practices and the resulting "energies" they unleash could lead people to "go totally nuts".

Wilson also criticized scientific types with overly rigid belief systems, equating them with religious fundamentalists in their fanaticism. In a 1988 interview, when asked about his newly published book The New Inquisition: Irrational Rationalism and the Citadel of Science, Wilson commented:

I coined the term irrational rationalism because those people claim to be rationalists, but they're governed by such a heavy body of taboos. They're so fearful, and so hostile, and so narrow, and frightened, and uptight and dogmatic ... I wrote this book because I got tired satirizing fundamentalist Christianity ... I decided to satirize fundamentalist materialism for a change, because the two are equally comical ... The materialist fundamentalists are funnier than the Christian fundamentalists, because they think they're rational! ... They're never skeptical about anything except the things they have a prejudice against. None of them ever says anything skeptical about the AMA, or about anything in establishment science or any entrenched dogma. They're only skeptical about new ideas that frighten them. They're actually dogmatically committed to what they were taught when they were in college.

== Thought ==
=== Model-agnostic ===
In a 2003 interview with High Times magazine, Wilson described himself as "model-agnostic" which he said

consists of never regarding any model or map of the universe with total 100% belief or total 100% denial. Following Korzybski, I put things in probabilities, not absolutes ... My only originality lies in applying this zetetic attitude outside the hardest of the hard sciences, physics, to softer sciences and then to non-sciences like politics, ideology, jury verdicts and, of course, conspiracy theory.

=== Economic thought ===
Wilson favored a form of basic income guarantee; synthesizing several ideas under the acronym RICH. His ideas are set forth in the essay "The RICH Economy", found in The Illuminati Papers. In an article critical of capitalism, Wilson self-identified as a "libertarian socialist", saying that "I ask only one thing of skeptics: don't bring up Soviet Russia, please. That horrible example of State Capitalism has nothing to do with what I, and other libertarian socialists, would offer as an alternative to the present system". By the 1980s, he was less enthusiastic about the socialist label, writing in Prometheus Rising that he "does not like" the spread of socialism.

In his book Right Where You Are Sitting Now, he praised the economist Silvio Gesell, writing "The only utopian economist I ever liked was Silvio Gesell. Of course, Gesell was a businessman, not an academic or an ideologue, so he had some common sense". In the essay Left and Right: A Non-Euclidean Perspective, Wilson speaks favorably of several "excluded middles" that "transcend the hackneyed debate between monopoly Capitalism and totalitarian Socialism"; he says his favorite is the mutualist anarchism of Benjamin Tucker and Pierre-Joseph Proudhon, but he also offers kind words for the ideas of Silvio Gesell, Henry George, C. H. Douglas, and Buckminster Fuller. Wilson also identified as an anarchist and described his belief system as "a blend of Tucker, Spooner, Fuller, Pound, Henry George, Rothbard, Douglas, Korzybski, Proudhon and Marx." Wilson spoke several times at conventions of the American Libertarian Party. He included Benjamin Tucker's Instead of a Book, Henry George's Progress and Poverty, and Silvio Gesell's The Natural Economic Order in a list of 20 book recommendations, "the bare minimum of what everybody really needs to chew and digest before they can converse intelligently about the 21st Century."

== Other activities ==
Robert Anton Wilson and his wife Arlen Riley Wilson founded the Institute for the Study of the Human Future in 1975.

From 1982 until his death, Wilson had a business relationship with the Association for Consciousness Exploration, which hosted his first on-stage dialogue with his long-time friend Timothy Leary entitled The Inner Frontier. Wilson dedicated his book The New Inquisition to A.C.E.'s co-directors, Jeff Rosenbaum and Joseph Rothenberg.

Wilson also joined the Church of the SubGenius, who referred to him as "Pope Bob". He contributed to their literature, including the book Three-Fisted Tales of "Bob", and shared a stage with their founder, Rev. Ivan Stang, on several occasions. Wilson also founded the Guns and Dope Party.

As a member of the Board of Advisors of the Fully Informed Jury Association, Wilson worked to inform the public about jury nullification, the right of jurors to nullify a law they deem unjust.

Wilson advocated for and wrote about E-Prime, a form of English lacking all forms of the verb "to be" (such as "is", "are", "was", "were" etc.).

"Is", "is." "is"—the idiocy of the word haunts me. If it were abolished, human thought might begin to make sense. I don't know what anything "is"; I only know how it seems to me at this moment.

— Robert Anton Wilson, The Historical Illuminatus Chronicles, as spoken by the character Sigismundo Celine

A decades-long researcher into drugs and a strong opponent of what he called "the war on some drugs", Wilson participated as a Special Guest in the week-long 1999 Annual Cannabis Cup in Amsterdam, and used and often promoted the use of medical marijuana. He participated in a protest organized by the Wo/Men's Alliance for Medical Marijuana in Santa Cruz in 2002.

== Death ==
On June 22, 2006, Paul Krassner reported on The Huffington Post that Wilson was under hospice care at home with friends and family. On October 2, Douglas Rushkoff reported that Wilson was in severe financial trouble. Slashdot, Boing Boing, and the Church of the SubGenius also picked up on the story, linking to Rushkoff's appeal. As his webpage reported on October 10, these efforts succeeded beyond expectation and raised a sum that would have supported him for at least six months. On October 5, 2006, Wilson responded to the support by posting the following comment on his personal website, expressing his gratitude:

Dear Friends, my God, what can I say. I am dumbfounded, flabbergasted, and totally stunned by the charity and compassion that has poured in here the last three days.

To steal from Jack Benny, "I do not deserve this, but I also have severe leg problems and I don't deserve them either."

Because he was a kind man as well as a funny one, Benny was beloved. I find it hard to believe that I am equally beloved and especially that I deserve such love.

Whoever you are, wherever you are, know that my love is with you.

You have all reminded me that despite George W. Bush and all his cohorts, there is still a lot of beautiful kindness in the world.

Blessings,

Robert Anton Wilson

On January 6, 2007, Wilson wrote on his blog that according to several medical authorities, he would likely only have between two days and two months left to live. He closed this message with "I look forward without dogmatic optimism but without dread. I love you all and I deeply implore you to keep the lasagna flying. Please pardon my levity, I don't see how to take death seriously. It seems absurd."

Wilson died five days later, on January 11 at 4:50 am, just a week short of his 75th birthday. After his cremation on January 18 (also his 75th birthday), his family held a memorial service on February 18 and then scattered most of his ashes at the same spot as his wife's—off the Santa Cruz Beach Boardwalk in Santa Cruz, California.

A tribute show to Wilson, organized by Coldcut and Mixmaster Morris and performed in London as a part of the "Ether 07 Festival" held at the Queen Elizabeth Hall on March 18, 2007, also included Ken Campbell, Bill Drummond and Alan Moore.

== Cultural references ==
Wilson appears as a fictional version of himself in Timothy Leary's 1979 book, The Intelligence Agents. It features a full facsimile reproduction of an article ostensibly authored by Wilson, titled Marilyn's Input System, from Peeple Magazine of March 1986.

== Bibliography ==
=== Novels ===
- The Sex Magicians (1973)
- The Illuminatus! Trilogy (1975) (with Robert Shea)
  - The Eye in the Pyramid
  - The Golden Apple
  - Leviathan
- Schrödinger's Cat Trilogy (1979–1981)
  - The Universe Next Door
  - The Trick Top Hat
  - The Homing Pigeons
- Masks of the Illuminati (1981)
- The Historical Illuminatus Chronicles
  - The Earth Will Shake (1982)
  - The Widow's Son (1985)
  - Nature's God (1988)

=== Autobiographical / philosophical ===
- Cosmic Trigger trilogy.
  - Cosmic Trigger I: The Final Secret of the Illuminati (1977)
  - Cosmic Trigger II: Down to Earth (1991)
  - Cosmic Trigger III: My Life After Death (1995)

External audio
- Audio excerpt of a reading of Chapter 1 by Ken Campbell and Chris Fairbank. Books-at-Beat-Time.

=== Non-fiction ===
- Playboy's Book of Forbidden Words (1972)
- Sex and Drugs: A Journey Beyond Limits (1973)
- The Book of the Breast (1974)
  - Revised as Ishtar Rising (1989)
- Neuropolitics (1978) (with Timothy Leary and George Koopman)
  - Revised as Neuropolitique (1988)
- The Game of Life (1979) (with Timothy Leary)
- Prometheus Rising (1983)
- The New Inquisition (1986)
- Natural Law, or Don't Put a Rubber on Your Willy (1987)
- Sex, Drugs and Magick: A Journey Beyond Limits (1988), revision, with new introduction, of Sex and Drugs: A Journey Beyond Limits
- Quantum Psychology (1990)
- Everything Is Under Control: Conspiracies, Cults and Cover-ups, with Miriam Joan Hill. New York: HarperCollins (1998)
- TSOG: The Thing That Ate the Constitution (2002)

=== Articles ===
- "Three Authors in Search of Sadism". The Realist, no. 67 (May 1966), p. 1. JSTOR community.28043504. OCLC 1763489.
- "Doom-Sayers, Nay-Sayers Converge". Berkeley Barb, vol. 23, no. 21 (June 4, 1976), p. 4. JSTOR community.28033583.
- "The End of the Work Ethic". City Miner, vol. 3, no. 4 (January 11, 1978), pp. 10–14. JSTOR community.28034969.

=== Letters ===
- "The Great Debate: Wilson Rebuts McKenney." Berkeley Barb, vol. 24, no. 4 (August 6, 1976), p. 10. JSTOR community.28033592.

=== Plays and screenplays ===
- Wilhelm Reich in Hell (1987)
- Reality Is What You Can Get Away With (1992; revised edition – new introduction added – 1996)
- The Walls Came Tumbling Down (1997)

=== Essay collections ===
- The Illuminati Papers (1980), collection of essays and new material
- Right Where You Are Sitting Now (1983), collection of essays and new material
- Coincidance: A Head Test (1988), collection of essays and new material
- Email to the universe and other alterations of consciousness (2005), collection of essays and new material
- More Chaos and Beyond (2019), posthumous anthology of previously uncollected material

=== As editor ===
- Semiotext(e) SF (1989) (anthology, editor, with Rudy Rucker and Peter Lamborn Wilson)
- Chaos and Beyond (1994) (editor and primary author)

== Discography ==
- A Meeting with Robert Anton Wilson (ACE) – cassette
- Religion for the Hell of It (ACE) – cassette
- H.O.M.E.s on LaGrange (ACE) – cassette
- The New Inquisition (ACE) – cassette
- The H.E.A.D. Revolution (ACE) – cassette and CD
- Prometheus Rising (ACE) – cassette
- The Inner Frontier (with Timothy Leary) (ACE) – cassette
- The Magickal Movement: Present & Future (with Margot Adler, Isaac Bonewits & Selena Fox) (ACE), panel Discussion – cassette
- Magick Changing the World, the World Changing Magick (ACE), panel Discussion – cassette
- The Self in Transformation (ACE) Panel Discussion – cassette
- The Once & Future Legend (with Ivan Stang, Robert Shea and others) (ACE) Panel Discussion – cassette
- What IS the Conspiracy, Anyway? (ACE), panel Discussion – cassette
- The Chocolate-Biscuit Conspiracy – album with The Golden Horde (1984)
- Twelve Eggs in a Basket – CD
- Robert Anton Wilson On Finnegans Wake and Joseph Campbell (interview by Faustin Bray and Brian Wallace) (1988) – 2-CD Set Sound Photosynthesis
- Acceleration of Knowledge (1991) – cassette
- Secrets of Power – comedy cassette
- Robert Anton Wilson Explains Everything: or Old Bob Exposes His Ignorance (2001), Sounds True, ISBN 978-1591793755

== Filmography ==
=== Actor ===
Wilson appeared in the 1998 German film 23 Nichts ist so wie es scheint. He has approximately two minutes featured as himself, with the main actor, portraying hacker Karl Koch, meeting Wilson at the annual German Computer Hackers Convention in 1985. The film is a biographical piece about Germany's infamous computer hackers, and the 1985 meeting in Germany between Wilson and Koch is authentic. Wilson spoke at the 1985 German Computer Hackers Convention, warning of a future in which governments would have total digital control over the citizen. He signed one of his books for Koch. These events are depicted in the film.

=== Writer ===
- Wilhelm Reich in Hell (2005) (Video) Deepleaf Productions

=== Himself ===
- Children of the Revolution: Tune Back In (2005) Revolutionary Child Productions
- The Gospel According to Philip K. Dick (2001) TKO Productions
- 23 (1998) (23 – Nichts ist so wie es scheint) Claussen & Wöbke Filmproduktion GmbH (Germany)
- Arise! The SubGenius Video (1992) (Recruitment Film #16) The SubGenius Foundation (USA)
- Borders (1989) Co-Directions Inc. (TV documentary)
- Fear in the Night: Demons, Incest and UFOs (1993) Video – Trajectories
- Twelve Eggs in a Box: Myth, Ritual and the Jury System (1994) Video – Trajectories
- Consciousness, Conspiracy and Coincidence (1995). Interview with Robert Anton Wilson. New Thinking Allowed, with Jeffrey Mishlove.
- Everything Is Under Control: Robert Anton Wilson in Interview (1998) Video – Trajectories

=== Documentary ===
- Maybe Logic: The Lives and Ideas of Robert Anton Wilson, a documentary featuring selections from over 25 years of Wilson footage, released on DVD in North America on May 30, 2006

== See also ==
- 23 Enigma
- Chaos magic
- Church of the Flying Spaghetti Monster
- General semantics
- List of Discordian works
- List of occult writers
- The Sekhmet Hypothesis
- Smart drugs (Nootropics)
