= Christopher Hyatt =

American psychologist, occultist and writer

- Born: Alan Ronald Miller; July 12, 1943; Chicago, Illinois, US
- Died: February 9, 2008 (aged 64); Scottsdale, Arizona, US
- Known for: Writings on the occult

Christopher Hyatt (July 12, 1943 – February 9, 2008), born Alan Ronald Miller, was an American psychologist, occultist, and writer. He was founder and president of New Falcon Publications, an independent publisher specializing in psychedelic and occult literature; Hyatt's press published work by several well-known champions of consciousness expansion, including Israel Regardie, Timothy Leary, Robert Anton Wilson, and Antero Alli.

Hyatt also co-founded with David Cherubim the Thelemic Order of the Golden Dawn, an order devoted to the philosophy of Thelema, in Los Angeles on the Vernal Equinox of 1990.

== Early life ==
A native of Chicago, Alan Miller, the son of police lieutenant Leonard Miller and his wife, Bertha Freidman, was born during what he described as the "roaring war years". Writing and speaking as Christopher Hyatt, Miller claimed to have dropped out of high school at the age of sixteen, working instead as a dishwasher and cook, roaming the United States. Miller's obituary states he left high school at 17 and joined the U.S.Navy.

== Academic career ==
Alan Miller was trained in experimental and clinical psychology and practiced as a psychotherapist. The 18 units earned from his military GED towards his first academic career were used at Los Angeles City College, where he studied accounting for two years. He later changed his graduate to General Psychology, earning master's degrees in experimental psychology and medical education and Counseling. He was a member of a Freudian clinic in Southern California. He spent almost a year studying hypnosis at the Hypnosis Motivation Institute in Los Angeles and also studied hypnosis at the University of California, Irvine. Miller held PhDs in both clinical psychology and human behavior and was a Postdoctoral researcher in Criminal Justice. Some of his techniques blended Reichian physiotherapy and tantric yoga. He also incorporated hypnosis alongside his bodywork with patients and students. In the late 1960s and early 1970s, Alan R. Miller's research was published in various peer-reviewed articles and professional journals.

== Occultism and publishing ==
Miller's interest in the occult began in his early twenties. His desire to further pursue his studies in magick resulted in meeting Israel Regardie in Studio City in the 1970s. Regardie introduced Miller to Reichian therapy, which he insisted Miller learn prior to any magical pursuits. Regardie further instructed Miller in the magical system of the Hermetic Order of the Golden Dawn. Miller formed New Falcon Publications in 1980 and, adopting the pseudonym Christopher S. Hyatt, began publishing out of his Sedona, Arizona home.

In 1987 Lon Milo DuQuette initiated Hyatt into Ordo Templi Orientis. Hyatt went on to become a Ninth Degree member of the order. He later co-founded (with David Cherubim) the Thelemic Order of the Golden Dawn in Los Angeles on the Vernal Equinox of 1990.

== Death ==
Hyatt died of cancer in Scottsdale, Arizona on February 9, 2008, at the age of 64.

== Publications ==
- Hyatt, Christopher S.; Slaughter, S. L. (1982). Dogma Daze. Phoenix: Falcon Press. ISBN 978-0-941404-22-8. OCLC 32332499.
- Hyatt, Christopher S. (1982). Undoing Yourself with Energized Meditation and Other Devices. Phoenix: Falcon Press. ISBN 978-1-56184-057-1.
- Hyatt, Christopher S.; Alli, Antero (1988). A Modern Shaman's Guide to a Pregnant Universe. Phoenix: Falcon Press. ISBN 978-0-941404-90-7.
- Hyatt, Christopher S. (1989). Secrets of Western Tantra: The Sexuality of the Middle Path. Phoenix: Falcon Press. ISBN 978-0-941404-80-8.
- Hyatt, Christopher S.; DuQuette, Lon Milo; Ford, Gary (1991). Taboo, 'the Ecstasy of Evil': The Psychopathology of Sex and Religion. Scottsdale, AZ: New Falcon Publications. ISBN 978-1-56184-039-7. OCLC 27959350.
- Hyatt, Christopher S.; DuQuette, Lon Milo (1991). The Way of the Secret Lover: Tantra, Tarot and the Holy Guardian Angel. Scottsdale, AZ: New Falcon Publications. ISBN 978-1-56184-044-1. OCLC 27972918.
- Crowley, Aleister; DuQuette, Lon Milo; Hyatt, Christopher S. (1992). Aleister Crowley's Illustrated Goetia: Sexual Evocation. David P. Wilson (illus.). Scottsdale, AZ: New Falcon Publications. ISBN 978-1-56184-048-9.
- Black, S. Jason; Hyatt, Christopher S. (1995). Urban Voodoo: A Beginners Guide to Afro-Caribbean Magic. Tempe, AZ: New Falcon Publications. ISBN 978-1-56184-059-5.
- Black, S. Jason; Hyatt, Christopher S. (1997). Pacts with the Devil: A Chronicle of Sex, Blasphemy & Liberation. Tempe, AZ: New Falcon Publications. ISBN 978-1-56184-058-8.
- Hyatt, Christopher S. (2000). The Psychopath's Bible. Tempe, AZ: New Falcon Publications. ISBN 978-1-56184-122-6.
- Hyatt, Christopher S.; Black, S. Jason (2000). Tantra without Tears. Tempe, AZ: New Falcon Publications. ISBN 978-1-56184-060-1. OCLC 255310509.
- Hyatt, Christopher S. (2004). Psychopath's Notebook. Tempe, AZ: Original Falcon Publications. ISBN 978-1-935150-44-2.
- Hyatt, Christopher S.; Iwema, Calvin (2005). Energized Hypnosis: A Non-Book for Self Change. Tempe, AZ: New Falcon Publications. ISBN 978-1-56184-193-6.

== See also ==
- List of Thelemites
- Members of Ordo Templi Orientis
