= Arpad Busson =

French investor and philanthropist (born 1963)

- Born: André Arpad Busson; 27 January 1963 (age 63); Boulogne-Billancourt, France
- Occupations: Hedge fund manager; investor; philanthropist; financial analyst
- Partners: Elle Macpherson (1996–2005); Uma Thurman (2007–2009; 2011–2014)
- Children: 3

André Arpad Busson (born 27 January 1963) is a French hedge fund manager, investor, and philanthropist. Busson started working in hedge funds in 1986 in New York. He is the founder and chairman of the EIM Group, a fund of funds company. Busson is also active in a number of philanthropic causes around the globe. According to the French business magazine Challenges, he had a net worth of €500 million in 2013.

== Early life ==
Arpad Busson's father, Pascal Busson, was a former French army officer and Algerian War veteran, who later turned financier. His mother, Florence "Flockie" Harcourt-Smith, was an English former debutante. His parents met in Paris and named their son after the Hungarian-born banker Árpád Plesch (1889–1974), who not only was Florence's step-father (he was the second husband of her mother, Marysia Ulam Krauss Harcourt-Smith), but had also been her step-grandfather (Plesch's first wife, Leonie Caro Ulam, was his second wife's mother). Plesch was a mentor to Italy's richest man, Gianni Agnelli, the late head of Fiat. Busson's aunt, Joanna Harcourt-Smith, was a companion of Timothy Leary, who coincidentally was married in the early 1960s to Nena von Schlebrügge, the mother of Arpad's partner Uma Thurman.

Busson is sometimes known by his nickname "Arki", a childhood conflation of Arpad and his mother Florence's nickname, Flockie.

Some sources have suggested that, while growing up in France, became a budding child businessman at a young age by raking in early profits selling toothpicks door-to-door (to which he denies), but he was educated in France and at the Institut Le Rosey, in Rolle, Switzerland. He then passed through national service as a medical orderly in the French army, of which a friend said: "He loved the discipline of the army – it was the making of him.".

== Finance career ==
Busson entered the world of hedge funds in 1986 working with Dubin Swieca. He was later employed as a marketing representative for Paul Tudor Jones's fund Tudor Investments.

In 1991, Busson founded the EIM Group to provide fund-of-fund management services to the growing institutional market for hedge funds. On 8 December 2008, EIM Group was reported as being a victim of Bernie Madoff's Ponzi scheme.

In November 2001, EIM, an asset management company run by Busson, was asked by the FBI to help trace the finances of al-Qaida. The FBI noted that the firm was not a target of the investigation, and was cooperating fully.

In December 2013, Busson merged his EIM group with Swiss listed investment company Gottex Fund Management Holdings. In July 2015, Busson was named the next executive chairman of Gottex Fund Management for the interim, following Joachim Gottschalk stepping down from the position and finding a permanent executive chairman.

Gottex Fund Management rebranded itself as LumX and was eventually delisted from the Swiss Stock Exchange in June 2020 after suffering losses of more than $55 million the previous five years, essentially ending Busson's time as a hedge fund manager.

== Charity ==
Busson is a proponent of "venture philanthropy", which seeks to multiply the effectiveness of charitable pursuits by applying to them the same management practices which are used in business ventures.

He is a founding trustee of the children's charity ARK (Absolute Return for Kids) and serves as chairman of its board of directors. Busson held the post of chairman since the charity's inception. He stepped down from that position in 2009 but remains a member of the Board as founding chairman, and as chairman of ARK US. ARK raises charitable contributions from the hedge fund industry for children who are victims of abuse, disability, illness and poverty. ARK finances and manages projects aimed at transforming the lives of children in Eastern Europe, South Africa and the UK through education and healthcare.

The annual Ark Dinner hosted by Busson sees a range of high-profile individuals attend the event to raise money for the charity. Previous years have seen the likes of Bill Clinton (2006), Queen Rania of Jordan (2010) and in 2011 the Duke and Duchess of Cambridge took the limelight as Prince William announced a joint venture by the Foundation of Prince William and Prince Harry and the Ark charity.

Its activities include funding treatment for AIDS victims in Africa, taking children out of care in Bulgaria and Romania and developing educational opportunities for disadvantaged children in India. It also operates eight academies, six of which are in London, through its subsidiary charity ARK Academies.

Busson says of ARK, "If we can apply the entrepreneurial principles we have brought to business to charity, we have a shot at having a really strong impact, to be able to transform the lives of children."

He is a patron of the Elton John AIDS Foundation and a founding member of Theodora Children's Trust, a charity which brings music, magic and laughter to children in hospital through visits from performers known as "Giggle Doctors".

== Personal life ==
Busson began a relationship with Australian supermodel Elle Macpherson in 1996. They have two sons together, born in 1998 and 2003. The family lived together in London until Busson and Macpherson's breakup in 2005.

Busson began dating American actress Uma Thurman in 2007 and they announced their engagement in June 2008. In November 2009, it was reported that the two had ended their engagement, but they reconciled soon after. Busson and Thurman have one daughter together, born in 2012. The couple called off the engagement for the second time in 2014. In January 2017, Thurman and Busson began a custody battle for their daughter. Thurman ultimately received primary physical custody later that month.

In 2012, Busson sold Andy Warhol's portrait Mao (1973) for $12 million at Phillips in New York.
