= Plesch =

Plesch is a surname. Notable people with the surname include:

- Martin Plesch (1978 - ...), Slovak theoretical physicist
- Árpád Plesch (1889–1974), Hungarian financier, banker, and lawyer
- Etti Plesch (1914–2003), Austro-Hungarian countess, huntress, racehorse owner and socialite
- János Plesch (1878–1957), Hungarian academic pathologist, physiologist, and physician
- Tine Plesch, German music journalist and feminist writer
