= Neurologic (book) =

1973 book by Timothy Leary and Joanna Harcourt-Smith

- First edition cover
- Author: Timothy Leary; Joanna Harcourt-Smith
- Subject: Philosophy
- Published: 1973
- Publication place: USA
- Pages: 64 pp. (third edition)
- OCLC: 3006096

Neurologic is a 1973 book by Timothy Leary and Joanna Harcourt-Smith. The work was written by Leary during his re-incarceration at the California Men's Colony (CMC) in San Luis Obispo, California, from February to April 1973. A portion of the book was also entered into testimony as an exhibit in his trial for his original prison escape from CMC facilitated by the Weather Underground on September 13, 1970. Leary was initially arrested in 1970 for possession of one tenth of a gram of cannabis ("two roaches"), and after escaping CMC he faced a lengthy prison term. The book was published after his extradition in 1973 and eventual conviction.

== Background ==
Neurologic was published during the clandestine literature phase in Leary's work, when much of his time was spent either in prison or on the run from the authorities. The first development of the ideas for the book began with Leary's early interest in mindmaps at Harvard and were to appear subsequently throughout his work.

Two separate instances of refinement and development of these ideas appeared in the early 1970s while Leary was living in exile in Europe. In 1970, Leary and his then-wife Rosemary were invited to Algeria as guests of Eldridge Cleaver and the Black Panther Party. While staying at the Hotel Mediterranee in Algiers, Leary wrote a letter to his compatriots back in the US dated March 10, 1971. The letter discussed early themes of what Leary called the "seven revolutions" (survival, political, economic, cultural, sexual, spiritual, and neurological). In June 1972, Leary was in Basel, Switzerland, when he published similar ideas in a brochure for an art exhibit known as Der Reiseweg (The Route) depicting paintings by Walter Wegmüller who was associated with the Krautrock movement.

Leary was captured by US authorities in Afghanistan on January 14, 1973, and extradited back to the US on January 18, 1973, where he was returned to the California Men's Colony and held in confinement before standing trial. At his trial, in March 1973, Leary said his occupation was that of a "neurologician," a word, he explained to the jury, he had just invented. Leary appeared to many to be mounting an insanity defense based on diminished capacity; he had previously been subjected to an IQ test, and the results were submitted at the trial showing he had a so-called genius level IQ of 143.

== Development ==
Leary began writing Neurologic while he was imprisoned in solitary confinement in 1973. Biographer Robert Greenfield estimates that the entire writing process took Leary about ten weeks. According to Leary, the prison forced him to ingest high doses of chlorpromazine (Thorazine) and interfered with his sleep by waking him up in the middle of the night. Author Robert Anton Wilson described Leary's writing as rushed and haphazard: "Leary wrote this essay in a hurry, with no research sources available, on the floor of a solitary confinement cell, under a 40-watt bulb".

Leary composed the material for the book with a small stub of a pencil on the back of a legal brief by Angela Davis, which was secretly removed from the prison and delivered to Joanna Harcourt-Smith, who at that time went by the name Joanna Leary to reflect their common-law marriage. Joanna distributed the material in the form of photocopies in the first two issues, followed by two additional clandestine editions, then finally a print version in 1973. She used the proceeds from the sale of the books for a defense fund to help get Leary released from prison.

In 1983, Leary recalled the development of the book in his autobiography Flashbacks: "In solitary I awaited trial for my escape. I used this time in solitary confinement to meditate about developmental psychology and the stages of evolution. For hours I would pace the cage-seven steps forward, turn, seven steps back-putting myself in deep trance states of tranquil illumination. The single cell is a powerful habitat from which to view the world. Legal documents were the only paper allowed in the hole, so I sat on the floor under the dim naked bulb and wrote on the back of a legal brief, with this two-inch pencil stub, still another complete system of philosophy. It was one of those inspired clear-channel transmissions. I had been thinking about the classification of brain circuits for years, and now in slow tidy handwriting, with almost no corrections, the words poured out."

== Critical reception ==
Critic Erik Davis describes the book as an outline of the "social-cybernetic and ultimately mystical model of the human nervous system". Davis notes that Neurologic represents a shift in Leary's previous thought from works concerned with "hippie Hinduism" to that of a kind of scientific philosophy, or "PSY PHI" as Leary called it. Cultural historian John Higgs argues that Leary's idea of the mindmap exemplified by Neurologic is "arguably Leary's most important work", but was greatly diminished by newspaper accounts of his prison escape and related travails. Journalist John Bryan said that Leary sounded "like a Raving Madman from Outer Space. It was at this point that many of his former followers decided that Tim had overdosed-both on acid and on life."

== Related works ==
Leary expanded on the initial ideas expressed in Neurologic in later works such as Exo-Psychology (1977) and The Game of Life (1979). Erik Davis and historian W. Patrick McCray note that the original seven circuit model Leary describes in Neurologic later became known as the eight-circuit model of consciousness with the help of author Robert Anton Wilson, who wrote about it in Cosmic Trigger (1977) and Prometheus Rising (1983).

== Bibliography ==
- Conners, Peter (2011). White Hand Society: The Psychedelic Partnership of Timothy Leary & Allen Ginsberg. City Lights. ISBN 9780872865358.
- Davis, Erik. (2019). High Weirdness: Drugs, Esoterica, and Visionary Experience in the Seventies. MIT Press. ISBN 978-1907222-870
- Greenfield, Robert (2006). Timothy Leary: A Biography. Harcourt. ISBN 978-0-15-100500-0.
- Higgs, John (2006). I Have America Surrounded: The Life of Timothy Leary. Barricade Books. ISBN 1-56980-315-3.
- Horowitz, Michael. Walls, Karen. Smith, Billy (1988). An Annotated Bibliography of Timothy Leary. Archon Books. ISBN 0-208-02064-0.
- Leary, Timothy (1990)[1983]. Flashbacks: A Personal and Cultural History of an Era. G. P. Putnam's Sons. ISBN 0-87477-870-0.
- McCray, W. Patrick (2016). Groovy Science: Knowledge, Innovation, and American Counterculture. University of Chicago Press. ISBN 9780226372914.
- Ulrich, Jennifer. (2018). The Timothy Leary Project: Inside the Great Counterculture Experiment. Abrams Press. ISBN 978-1-4197-2646-0.
- Wilson, Robert Anton (August 1975). "Neurologic Immortality & All That". Green Egg. 8 (72): 9–11.
