= Programming and Metaprogramming in the Human Biocomputer =

1968 non-fiction book by John C. Lilly

- 1972 edition
- Author: John C. Lilly
- Language: English
- Genre: Non-fiction
- Publisher: Communication Research Institute (1968), Julian Press (1972)
- Publication date: 1968
- ISBN: 0-517-52757-X (Julian Press, 1987)
- OCLC: 656199271
- Dewey Decimal: 612/.82
- LC Class: QP376 .L57 1968
- Followed by: The Center of the Cyclone
- Website: www.johnclilly.com/programming01.html

Programming and Metaprogramming in the Human Biocomputer: Theory and Experiments is a 1968 book by John C. Lilly. In the book, "the doctor imagines the brain as a piece of computer technology." More specifically, he uses "the analogy of brain being the hardware, the mind being the software and consciousness being beyond both."

== Summary ==
The term human biocomputer, coined by Lilly, refers to the "hardware" of the human anatomy. This would include the brain, internal organs, and other human organ systems such as cardiovascular, digestive, endocrine, immune, integumentary, lymphatic, muscular, nervous, reproductive, respiratory, skeletal, and urinary systems. The biocomputer has stored program properties, and self-metaprogramming properties, with limits determinable and to be determined.

=== Definitions ===
The following definitions are used in the book:

- Mind, which is defined as the sum total of all the programs and metaprograms (and even supraself metaprograms) of a human biocomputer. This is the software and is looked at as the opposite of the hardware.
- Brain, which is defined as the visible, palpable living set of structures to be included in the human biocomputer.
- Stored program, which is defined as a set of instructions which are placed in memory storage of the biocomputer, and which control the biocomputer when orders are given for that program to be activated. These programs can be activated by the same biocomputer, another biocomputer, or a situation outside of the biocomputer.
- Metaprogramming, which is defined as a set of instructions, descriptions, and implementations of related thoughts and actions (programs). Self-metaprogramming involves the creation, revision, and reorganization of programs and metaprograms.

=== Organization ===
The functional organization of the human biocomputer described in the book is:

Level	Description	Parts
11	Above and in biocomputer	unknown
10	Beyond metaprogramming	supra-species-metaprograms
9	To be metaprogrammed	supra-self-metaprograms
8	To metaprogram	self-metaprogram awareness
7	To program sets of programs	metaprograms metaprogram storage
6	Detailed instructions	programs program storage
5	Details of instructions	subroutines subroutine storage
4	Signs of activity	biochemical activity neural activity glial activity vascular activity
3	Brain	biochemical brain neural brain glial brain vascular brain
2	Body	biochemical body sensory body motor body vascular body
1	External reality	biochemical chemical physical

The levels of the human biocomputer are explained thus: Levels from one to two are the boundaries between external reality and the body. Certain energies and materials (heat, light, sound, food, and secretions) pass through this boundary in special places. Levels two to three are the boundaries of body and brain, in which special structures such as blood vessels, nerve fibers, and cerebrospinal fluid pass. Levels four through eleven are in the brain circuitry, and is the software inside the biocomputer. Levels after ten are termed unknown. This is to allow an openness for future scientific research, and discoveries. This is also to illustrate the unwillingness to subscribe to any dogmatic belief, to encourage creative, courageous and imaginative investigation, to emphasize the necessity for unknown factors on all levels, and to point out the heuristic nature of this schema.

== Editions ==
- Lilly, John C. (1987) [1968, Communication Research Institute]. Programming and Metaprogramming in the Human Biocomputer: Theory and Experiments (Reprint ed.). Julian Press. ISBN 0-517-52757-X.

== See also ==
- Eight-circuit model – Philosophical concept by Timothy Leary
- Laws of Form – 1969 non-fiction book by G. Spencer-Brown
- Neurologic – 1973 book by Timothy Leary and Joanna Harcourt-Smith
- Reality tunnel – Theory of personal perception
