= Rosemary Woodruff Leary =

American model and author

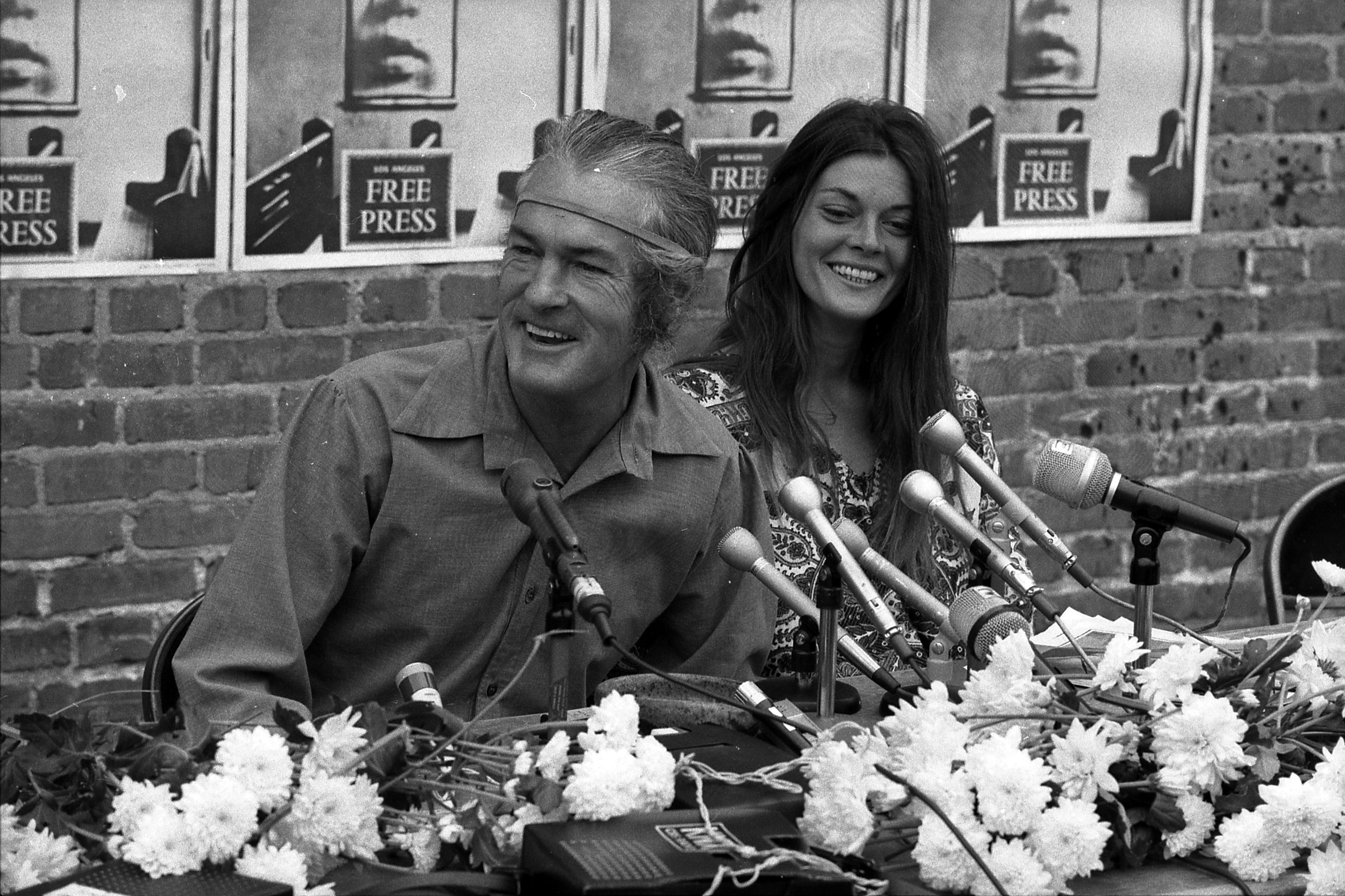
- Woodruff and her husband, Timothy Leary, in 1969
- Born: April 26, 1935; St. Louis, Missouri, U.S.
- Died: February 7, 2002 (aged 66); Aptos, California, U.S.

Rosemary Sarah Woodruff Leary (April 26, 1935 – February 7, 2002) was an American model and author, known for her experiences with psychedelic drugs. She was the fourth of the psychologist Timothy Leary's five wives. Woodruff spent much of her adult life abroad, after helping Leary to escape prison and flee the country on charges of drug possession.

== Biography ==
Woodruff was born in St. Louis, Missouri, in 1935 to a middle-class family. Her father was an amateur magician, and she grew up in a conservative Baptist environment. At the age of seventeen, Woodruff dropped out of high school. She worked several different jobs, including as a model and as a flight stewardess for El Al Airlines. She married twice, first to an officer in the air force and second to a jazz musician. Both marriages ended in divorce.

At an art exhibition in 1965, Woodruff met the Harvard psychologist Timothy Leary. They married in 1967. The couple engaged in experimental drug use, leading to several arrests. In 1970, Woodruff was sentenced to six months in prison on charges of drug possession, while Leary was sentenced to 28 years. Following her release, Woodruff helped Leary escape from prison, with the aid of the Weather Underground, and the couple took refuge in Algeria. Woodruff remained abroad for 23 years in multiple countries after separating from Leary in 1971.

Woodruff surrendered to authorities in the United States in 1994. A judge declined to pursue further penalties against her, considering the time elapsed. She reconnected with Leary, who was again incarcerated in the United States. He appointed her the executor of his estate before he died in 1996. In her later years, Woodruff taught classes about the 1960s at the University of California, Santa Cruz. She also worked on two memoirs. The Magician's Daughter, was never published, while another, Psychedelic Refugee, was published posthumously in 2021. Woodruff died in 2002 at the age of 66 from congestive heart failure.
