= Question authority =

Slogan popularized by psychologist Timothy Leary

"Question authority" is a popular slogan often used on bumper stickers, T-shirts and as graffiti. The slogan was popularized by controversial psychologist Timothy Leary, although some people have suggested that the idea behind the slogan can be traced back to the ancient Greek philosopher Socrates. Benjamin Franklin is often quoted saying "It is the first responsibility of every citizen to question authority," although the quote cannot be positively attributed to him.

One of the most influential icons in the counterculture movement which formed in the late 1960s out of opposition to the Vietnam War's escalation, Leary gained influence among much of the youth by advocating the use of LSD as a way of mind expansion and the revelation of personal truth. LSD was criminalized in the United States in 1966. Following the Watergate Scandal, which resulted in the resignation of US President Richard Nixon and the conviction of several officials in the Nixon administration, the slogan became arguably the most accepted form of ideology among baby boomers. Nixon called Leary "the most dangerous man alive," to which Leary responded, saying "I was thrilled. The president of the United States, whom many Americans and the rest of the world thought was a crazed, psychotic danger, for him to be calling me that, [...] that's my Nobel Prize, that's my bumper sticker, that's my trophy on the wall."

It is intended to encourage people to avoid fallacious appeals to authority. The term has always symbolized the necessity of paying attention to the rules and regulations promulgated by a government unto its citizenry. However, psychologists have also criticized Leary's method of questioning authority and have argued that it resulted in widespread dysfunctionality. In their book Question Authority to Think for Yourself, psychologists Beverly Potter and Mark Estren alleged that the practice of Leary's philosophy enhances a person's self-interest and greatly weakens the ability to cooperate with others.

However, Leary's philosophy was foreseen in concept by C. Wright Mills in his 1956 book, The Power Elite.

Authority formally resides "in the people", but the power of initiation is in fact held by small circles of men. That is why the standard strategy of manipulation is to make it appear that the people, or at least a large group of them, "really made the decision". That is why even when authority is available, men with access to it may still prefer the secret, quieter ways of manipulation.

Mills noted earlier that "It is in this mixed case – as in the intermediate reality of the American today – that manipulation is a prime way of exercising power."

== See also ==
- Anti-authoritarianism
- Anti-statism
- Anarchism
- Age of Enlightenment
- Libertarianism
- No gods, no masters
- Skepticism
