= Joanna Harcourt-Smith =

Author, poet, psychedelic activist (1946–2020)

Joanna Marysia Harcourt-Smith
- Born: 13 January 1946; St. Moritz, Switzerland
- Died: 11 October 2020 (aged 74); Santa Fe, New Mexico, U.S.
- Occupations: Psychedelic activist, author, poet, podcaster
- Spouses: Nico Tambacopoulou (m. 1966, divorced); John d'Amécourt (m. 1971, divorced)
- Partners: Timothy Leary (1972–1977); Jose Luis Gomez Soler (–2020)
- Children: 3
- Family: Cecil Harcourt-Smith (grandfather); Stanislaw Ulam (cousin); Árpád Plesch (stepfather); Arpad Busson (nephew)

Joanna Harcourt-Smith (13 January 1946 – 11 October 2020) was a British-born author, poet, and psychedelic activist from an aristocratic background. She was the granddaughter of Sir Cecil Harcourt-Smith and the stepdaughter of financier Árpád Plesch. In 1972, she met Timothy Leary and traveled with him to Afghanistan, where he was arrested and extradited to the U.S. Her memoir, Tripping the Bardo with Timothy Leary, inspired the 2020 documentary My Psychedelic Love Story. She later hosted the Future Primitive podcast, exploring oral traditions and environmental themes. Harcourt-Smith died in Santa Fe, New Mexico, at 74.

== Biography ==
She was born at the Palace Hotel, St. Moritz, in Switzerland.

Harcourt-Smith wrote two unpublished biographies and many poems. She is also the author of Tripping the Bardo with Timothy Leary: My Psychedelic Love Story. The book recounts her experiences while "she was a flower-power teenager in the Sixties," lived with the Rolling Stones in France, cavorted with playboy Gunter Sachs, Salvador Dalí and the Aga Khan, before falling in love with Timothy Leary in 1972.

Although they were never legally married, Tripping the Bardo with Timothy Leary describes Harcourt-Smith's experiences as Timothy Leary's "common-law wife" between 1972 and 1977, a period that spanned the divide between his fourth and fifth marriages. They met while he was a fugitive in Europe, and from there the pair traveled to Afghanistan together. He was arrested in Afghanistan and the couple was extradited to California. While in the U.S., Harcourt-Smith advocated for Leary's release during his four-year imprisonment. Following his release they entered the Witness Protection Program.

My Psychedelic Love Story, a documentary by acclaimed American writer, filmmaker and director Errol Morris based on Harcourt-Smith's book, was released on Showtime on 29 November 2020.

On her weekly podcast, Future Primitive, Harcourt-Smith did and archived almost 700 interviews, from 2006 through 2020. The interviews focused on preserving oral traditions and uniting emergent communities for a future that honors the planet. Harcourt-Smith interviewed prominent thinkers of our times, visionaries, authors, psychedelic researchers and scholars. From 2022, her daughter Lara Tambacopoulou has continued the series.

== Personal life ==
She was the granddaughter of Sir Cecil Harcourt-Smith and the stepdaughter of financier Árpád Plesch, and the aunt of financier Arpad Busson.

In 1966 Harcourt-Smith married Nico Tambacopoulou in a ceremony that was attended by Prince Rainier and Princess Grace of Monaco, and actor William Holden. The marriage ended in divorce. In 1971 she married John d'Amécourt and later divorced.

She had 3 children, Lara Tambacopoulou, Alexis d'Amecourt, and Marlon Gobel, and 3 grandchildren, Nicholas Pulford, Alexander Pulford, and Harper d'Amecourt.

Harcourt-Smith spoke five languages, speaking three very well and two well enough to build relationships.

She died on 11 October 2020 at the age of 74, at her home in Santa Fe, New Mexico surrounded by her children, grandchildren and her partner, Jose Luis Gomez Soler.
