= John C. Lilly =

American physician, scientist, psychonaut, and philosopher

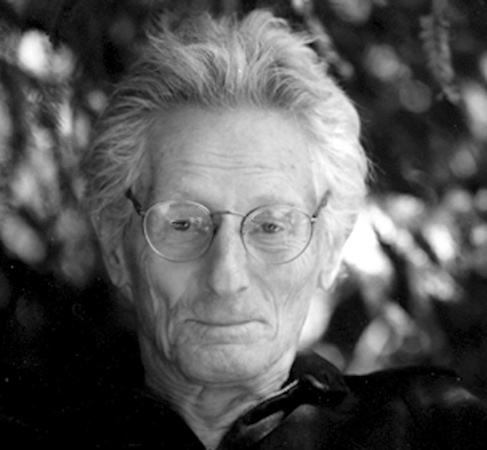
- Born: John Cunningham Lilly; January 6, 1915; Saint Paul, Minnesota, U.S.
- Died: September 30, 2001 (aged 86); Los Angeles, California, U.S.
- Education: California Institute of Technology (B.S.); Geisel School of Medicine at Dartmouth; University of Pennsylvania (M.D.)
- Known for: Isolation tank
- Relatives: Julia Cunningham (cousin)
- Website: www.johnclilly.com

John Cunningham Lilly (January 6, 1915 – September 30, 2001) was an American physician, neuroscientist, psychoanalyst, psychonaut, philosopher, writer, and inventor. He was a member of a group of counterculture thinkers that included Timothy Leary, Ram Dass, and Werner Erhard, all frequent visitors to the Lilly home. He often stirred controversy, especially among mainstream scientists.

Lilly conducted high-altitude research during World War II and later trained as a psychoanalyst. He gained renown in the 1950s after developing the isolation tank. He saw the tanks, in which users are isolated from almost all external stimuli, as a means to explore the nature of human consciousness. He later combined that work with his efforts to communicate with dolphins. He began studying how bottlenose dolphins vocalize, establishing centers in the U.S. Virgin Islands, and later San Francisco, to study dolphins. A decade later, he began experimenting with psychedelics, including LSD, often while floating in isolation. His work inspired two Hollywood movies, The Day of the Dolphin (1973) and Altered States (1980).

Lilly's Maxim

In the province of the mind what one believes to be true, either is true or becomes true within certain limits. These limits are to be found experimentally and experientially. When so found these limits turn out to be further beliefs to be transcended. In the province of the mind there are no limits.

— John C. Lilly, Programming and Metaprogramming in the Human Biocomputer

== Early life and education ==
Lilly was born to a wealthy family on January 6, 1915, in Saint Paul, Minnesota. His father was Richard Coyle Lilly, president of the First National Bank of St. Paul. His mother was Rachel Lenor Cunningham, whose family owned the Cunningham & Haas Company, a large stockyards company in St. Paul. Lilly had an older brother, Richard Lilly Jr., and a younger brother, David Maher Lilly. A fourth child, Mary Catherine Lilly, died in infancy.

Lilly showed an interest in science at an early age. At thirteen years old, he was an avid chemistry hobbyist, supplementing his makeshift basement laboratory with chemicals given to him by a pharmacist friend. Students at his parochial Catholic grade school called him "Einstein Jr." At age 14 he enrolled at St. Paul Academy (SPA), a college preparatory academy for boys, where his teachers encouraged him to pursue science further and conduct his experiments in the school laboratory after hours.

While at SPA, Lilly also further developed his interest in philosophy. He studied the works of many of the great philosophers, finding himself especially attracted to the subjective idealism of Irish theologian and philosopher George Berkeley.

Despite his father's wish that he go to an eastern Ivy League university to become a banker, Lilly received a scholarship at the California Institute of Technology in Pasadena, California, where he studied biology. He was the president of the ski club and a member of the drama club, and lived in Blacker House. After his first year, Caltech learned that Lilly was from a wealthy family and cancelled his scholarship, forcing him to go to his father for help. Dick Lilly set up a trust fund to pay the tuition and eventually became a benefactor of the college. Lilly continued to draw on his family wealth to fund his scientific pursuits throughout his life.

In 1934, Lilly read Aldous Huxley's Brave New World. The pharmacological control methods of Huxley's dystopia and the links between physical chemical processes of the brain and subjective experiences of the mind helped inspire Lilly to give up his study of physics and pursue biology, eventually focusing on neurophysiology.

Lilly was engaged to Mary Crouch at the beginning of his junior year at Caltech. Months before their wedding, he took a job with a lumber company in the Northwest to soothe a bout of "nervous exhaustion" brought on by the pressures of academia and his upcoming marriage. During this sabbatical he was hospitalized after injuring his foot with an ax while cutting brush. His time in the trauma ward inspired him to become a doctor of medicine.

In 1937, while Lilly was looking for a good medical school, his wealthy and well-connected father arranged a meeting between Lilly and Charles Horace Mayo of the famous Mayo Clinic in Rochester, Minnesota. Following Mayo's advice, Lilly applied and was accepted to Geisel School of Medicine at Dartmouth College in Hanover, New Hampshire, where he became good friends with Mayo's son, Charles William Mayo. Lilly graduated from Caltech with a Bachelor of Science degree on June 10, 1938, and enrolled at Dartmouth the following September.

At Dartmouth, Lilly launched into the study of anatomy, performing dissections on 32 cadavers during his time there. He once stretched out an entire intestinal tract across the length of a room to determine its actual length with certainty.

During the summer after his first year at Dartmouth, Lilly returned to Pasadena to participate in an experiment with his former Caltech biochemistry professor Henry Borsook. The purpose of the experiment was to study the creation of glycocyamine, a major source of muscle power in the human body. The experiment involved putting Lilly on a completely protein-free diet while administering measured doses of glycine and arginine, the two amino acids that Borsook hypothesized were involved in the creation of glycocyamine. The experiments pushed Lilly to extreme physical and mental limits; he became increasingly weak and delirious as the weeks went on. The results of the experiment confirmed Borsook's hypothesis and Lilly's name was included among the authors, making it the first published research paper of his career. It was also one of the first instances of a lifelong pattern of experimenting on his own body to the point of endangering his health.

After two years at Dartmouth, Lilly decided that he wanted to pursue a career in medical research, rather than therapeutic practice as was standard for Dartmouth medical students at that time. He decided to transfer to the medical school at the University of Pennsylvania, which would provide him with better opportunities for conducting research.

At the University of Pennsylvania, Lilly met Professor H. Cuthbert Bazett, a protege of British physiologist J. B. S. Haldane. Bazett introduced Lilly to Haldane's view that scientists should never conduct an experiment or procedure on another person that they have not first conducted on themselves, a view Lilly embraced and attempted to exemplify throughout his career. Bazett took a liking to the young, enthusiastic graduate student, and set Lilly up with his own research laboratory. While working under Bazett, Lilly created his first invention, the electrical capacitance diaphragm manometer, a device for measuring blood pressure. While designing the instrument, he received electrical engineering advice from biophysics pioneer Britton Chance. Chance also introduced Lilly to the world of computers, which was still in its infancy.

While finishing his degree at the University of Pennsylvania, Lilly enrolled in a class entitled "How to Build an Atomic Bomb." He and several other students transcribed their notes from the class into a book with the same title. The director of the Manhattan Project, General Leslie Groves, attempted to suppress publication of the book, but was unable to because no classified data were used in writing the book.

Lilly graduated with a medical degree from the University of Pennsylvania in 1942.

== Career overview ==
Lilly was a physician and psychoanalyst. He made contributions in the fields of biophysics, neurophysiology, electronics, computer science, and neuroanatomy. He invented and promoted the use of an isolation tank as a means of sensory deprivation. He also attempted communication between humans and dolphins.

Lilly's career as a scientist began doing research for universities and government. He gradually began researching less conventional topics. He published 19 books, including The Center of the Cyclone, which describes his own LSD experiences, and Man and Dolphin and The Mind of the Dolphin, which describe his work with dolphins.

In the mid-1950s, Lilly began dolphin cognition and communication research, with an intensive period of work through the late 1960s. This period brought many discoveries about dolphin anatomy and brain structure, as well as behavioral and communication observations. Originally researching at Coconut Grove, Florida, Lilly purchased a property in Saint Thomas, U.S. Virgin Islands in 1960. The seaside lab was converted into a dolphin–human cohabitation house by intentionally flooding part of the building.

In the 1980s Lilly directed a project that attempted to teach dolphins a computer-synthesised language. He designed a future "communications laboratory" that would be a floating living room where humans and dolphins could chat as equals and develop a common language. In the 1990s Lilly moved to Maui, Hawaii where he lived most of the remainder of his life.

=== Research ===
During World War II, Lilly researched the physiology of high-altitude flying and invented instruments for measuring gas pressure. After the war, he trained in psychoanalysis at the University of Pennsylvania, where he began researching the physical structures of the brain and consciousness. In 1951 he published a paper showing how he could display patterns of brain electrical activity on a cathode ray display screen using electrodes he devised specially for insertion into a living brain. Furthermore, Lilly's work on electrical stimulation of the nervous system gave rise to biphasic charge balanced electrical stimulation pulses (later known as "Lilly's wave" or "Lilly's pulses"), now an established approach to design of safe electrical stimulation in neuroprosthetics. In the 1960s he sponsored research on human–animal communication with a dolphin.

=== Development of the isolation tank ===
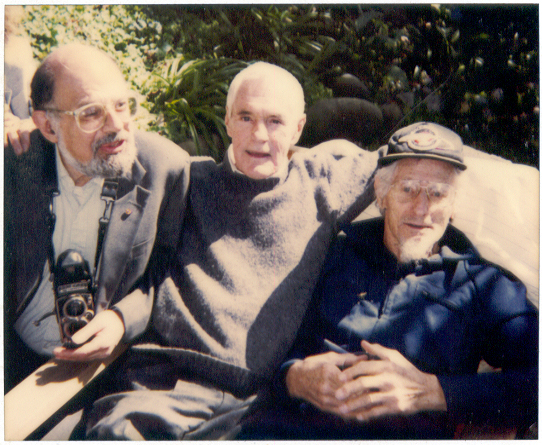
Allen Ginsberg, Timothy Leary, and John C. Lilly in 1991

In 1953, Lilly began a job studying neurophysiology with the U.S. Public Health Service Commissioned Officers Corps. At the N.I.M.H. in 1954, with the aim of isolating a brain from external stimulation, he devised the first isolation tank, a dark soundproof tank of warm salt water in which subjects could float for long periods in sensory isolation. Lilly and a research colleague were the first subjects of this research. What had been known as perceptual isolation or sensory deprivation was reconceptualized as Restricted Environmental Stimulation Technique (R.E.S.T.).

Lilly later studied other large-brained mammals and during the late 1950s he established a facility devoted to fostering human–dolphin communication: the Communication Research Institute on St. Thomas in the Virgin Islands. During the early 1960s, Lilly and coworkers published several papers reporting that dolphins could mimic human speech patterns.

=== S.E.T.I. ===
Lilly was interested in the Search for Extraterrestrial Intelligence (SETI) project. In 1961 a group of scientists including Lilly gathered at the Green Bank Observatory to discuss the possibility of using the techniques of radio astronomy to detect evidence of intelligent life outside the solar system. They called themselves The Order of the Dolphin after Lilly's work with dolphins. They discussed the Drake equation, used to estimate the number of communicative civilizations in our galaxy.

=== Exploration of human consciousness ===
In the early 1960s, Lilly was introduced to psychedelic drugs such as LSD and began a series of experiments in which he ingested a psychedelic drug either in an isolation tank or in the company of dolphins. These events are described in his books Programming and Metaprogramming in the Human Biocomputer, published in 1968, and The Center of the Cyclone, published in 1972. Following advice from Ram Dass, Lilly studied Patanjali's system of yoga (finding I. K. Taimni's Science of Yoga, a modernized interpretation of the Sanskrit text, most suited to his goals). He also paid special attention to self-enquiry meditation advocated by Ramana Maharshi, and reformulated the principles of this exercise with reference to his human biocomputer paradigm (described in Lilly (1968) and Lilly (1972)).

Lilly later traveled to Chile and trained with the spiritual leader Oscar Ichazo, whose attitude to metaphysical consciousness exploration Lilly characterized as "empirical". Lilly wrote that he had achieved the maximum degree of satori-samādhi consciousness during his training.

Lilly's maxim: "In the province of the mind what one believes to be true, either is true or becomes true within certain limits. These limits are to be found experimentally and experientially. When so found these limits turn out to be further beliefs to be transcended. In the province of the mind there are no limits. However, in the province of the body there are definite limits not to be transcended."

=== "Solid State Intelligence" ===
Solid State Intelligence (S.S.I.) is a malevolent entity described by Lilly in his 1978 autobiography, The Scientist. According to Lilly, the network of computation-capable solid state systems (electronics) engineered by humans will eventually develop into an autonomous "bioform." Since the optimal survival conditions for this bioform (low-temperature vacuum) are drastically different from those humans need (room temperature aerial atmosphere and adequate water supply), Lilly predicted a dramatic conflict between the two forms of intelligence.

=== Earth Coincidence Control Office (E.C.C.O.) ===
In 1974, Lilly's research using various psychoactive drugs led him to believe in the existence of a certain hierarchical group of cosmic entities, the lowest of which he later dubbed Earth Coincidence Control Office (E.C.C.O.) in an autobiography published jointly with his wife Antonietta (often called Toni). Lilly states that "[t]here exists a Cosmic Coincidence Control Center (CCCC) with a Galactic substation called Galactic Coincidence Control (GCC). Within GCC is the Solar System Control Unit (SSCU), within which is the Earth Coincidence Control Office (ECCO)."

Lilly also wrote that there are nine conditions that should be followed by people who seek to experience coincidence in their own lives:

1. You must know/assume/simulate our existence in E.C.C.O.
2. You must be willing to accept our responsibility for control of your coincidences.
3. You must exert your best capabilities for your survival programs and your own development as an advancing/advanced member of E.C.C.O.'s earthside corps of controlled coincidence workers. You are expected to use your best intelligence in this service.
4. You are expected to expect the unexpected every minute, every hour of every day and of every night.
5. You must be able to maintain conscious/thinking/reasoning no matter what events we arrange to happen to you. Some of these events will seem cataclysmic/catastrophic/overwhelming: remember to stay aware, no matter what happens/apparently happens to you.
6. You are in our training program for life: there is no escape from it. We (not you) control the long-term coincidences; you (not we) control the shorter-term coincidences by your own efforts.
7. Your major mission on earth is to discover/create that which we do to control the long-term coincidence patterns: you are being trained on Earth to do this job.
8. When your mission on planet Earth is completed, you will no longer be required to remain/return there.
9. Remember the motto passed to us (from G.C.C. via S.S.C.U.): "Cosmic Love is absolutely Ruthless and Highly Indifferent: it teaches its lessons whether you like/dislike them or not."

== Personal life ==
Lilly married Mary Crouch in 1936. In 1937, they had their first son, John Jr. Lilly. In 1943, they had their second son, Charles Lilly. In 1958, Lilly moved to the Virgin Islands.

In 1959, Lilly and Mary divorced but would remain friendly thereafter. During the same year (1959) Lilly married Elisabeth Bjerg whom he met on the islands. She was a divorced former fashion model and already had three children of her own. In 1960 the couple had Lilly's only biological daughter, Cynthia Olivia Roslyn. In May 1968, Lilly and Elisabeth separated, and they later divorced. Elisabeth left and took their children with her.

While still living in Los Angeles, Lilly met Antonietta (Toni) Lena in February 1971. Lena already had a daughter, Nina Carozza. Lilly and Lena formed a romantic as well as a spiritual relationship which later inspired the writing of their book The Dyadic Cyclone (1974). Lilly later described Lena as his "best friend, love, and wife." During the same year (1971) Lilly and his new family moved to Malibu, California, where they organized workshops with Lena. Lena died in 1986. Their daughter Nina Carozza Lilly continued living at Lilly's house in Malibu even after Lilly had moved out in 1992.

During the subsequent years, Lilly adopted two more daughters, including Lisa Lyon.

Lilly continued living in Malibu until 1992. In 1992 he moved to the Hawaiian island of Maui where he continued his research with dolphins and whales in the wild. From there he also continued travelling to and lecturing in Japan, Europe and the United States.

== Death ==
Lilly died of heart failure at age 86 in Los Angeles on September 30, 2001. His remains were cremated.

== Legacy ==
His literary rights and scientific discoveries were owned by Human Software, Inc., while his philanthropic endeavors were owned by the Human Dolphin Foundation. The John C. Lilly Research Institute, Inc. continues to research topics of interest to Lilly and carry on his legacy.

== In popular culture ==
Lilly's work with dolphins and the development of the sensory deprivation tank have been referenced in movies, music and television productions. Dolphin Island: A Story of the People of the Sea is a 1963 novel by Arthur C. Clarke set in a strange and fascinating research community where a brilliant professor tries to communicate with dolphins. In the 1972 novel The Listeners, Lilly and the other scientists who were members of the Order of the Dolphin are mentioned as pioneers.

The 1967 French science fiction thriller Un animal doué de raison by Robert Merle (translated into English as The Day of the Dolphin in 1969) features a central character who is a government scientist with similar ideas to those of Lilly.

In the 1973 film based on the book, George C. Scott portrays a Lilly-esque scientist, known to the dolphins as "Pa," who succeeds in teaching a dolphin to speak elementary English.

The 1980 movie Altered States, based on Paddy Chayefsky's novel of the same name, features actor William Hurt regressing to a simian form by ingesting psychoactive substances and then experiencing the effects of prolonged occupation of a sensory deprivation chamber.

In 1985, Dale Peterson and early art game designer John O'Neill consulted Lilly for assistance in developing their Commodore 64 game The Dolphin's Pearl (later retitled as The Dolphin's Rune).

Lilly's work with dolphins is mentioned in the 1998 psychological anime Serial Experiments Lain.

The video game Ecco the Dolphin (1992) is suspected to have been named in reference to the Earth Coincidence Control Office.

American avant-garde musician Laurie Anderson released a spoken-word song about Lilly titled "John Lilly" on her 1995 album, The Ugly One with the Jewels. In 2001 the supergroup Oysterhead released the single "Oz is Ever Floating" centered on John C. Lilly's isolation tank research with lyrics such as "Drifting as the time goes by Across the inner cosmos he is flying, His tank is isolating, In his mind he's elevating, All the things that mean the world to Dr. John C. Lilly, Are you still floating Dr. John C. Lilly? On June 15, 2014, comedians Dave Anthony and Gareth Reynolds published an episode of their podcast The Dollop about Lilly, where they detail his life, research, and drug use.

In 2019, Lilly's research was featured in the sixth season of Drunk History in the episode entitled "Drugs".

== Inventions ==
Besides the isolation tank, Lilly invented:

- Micrometric measurement of the melting point of drugs (Micro-melting Point Device for Drugs, 1940)
- Electric manometer (Electrical Capacitance Diaphragm Manometer, 1942)
- Nitrogen meter (Nitrogen Meter, 1943)
- Apparatus for measuring pressure variations (Variable Pressure and Mechanical Capacitor, 1947)
- Apparatus for measuring respiratory flow (Respiratory Flow Meter, 1950)
- Multi-Channel Electrical Imaging Apparatus (25 Channel Bavatron and Electro-Iconograms, 1950)

== Bibliography ==
=== Selected articles ===
- Lilly, J. C.; Austin, G. M.; Chambers, W. W. (July 1952). "Threshold movements produced by excitation of cerebral cortex and efferent fibers with some parametric regions of rectangular current pulses (cats and monkeys)" (PDF). Journal of Neurophysiology. 15 (4): 319–41. doi:10.1152/jn.1952.15.4.319. PMID 14955703.
- Lilly, J. C.; Hughes, J. R.; Alvord, E. C.; Galkin, T. W. (April 1, 1955). "Brief, Noninjurious Electric Waveform for Stimulation of the Brain". Science. 121 (3144): 468–469. Bibcode:1955Sci...121..468L. doi:10.1126/science.121.3144.468. PMID 14358670.
- Lilly, John C. (1956). "Mental Effects of Reduction of Ordinary Levels of Physical Stimuli on Intact, Healthy Persons". Psychiatric Research Reports. Vol. 5. pp. 1–9.
- Lilly, J. C.; Miller, A. M. (1961). "Vocal Exchanges between Dolphins". Science.
- Lilly, John C.; Shurley, Jay T. (1961). "Experiments in solitude, in maximum achievable physical isolation with water suspension, of intact healthy persons". In Flaherty, Bernard E. (ed.). Psychophysiological Aspects of Space Flight. New York: Columbia University Press. OCLC 609293243.
- Lilly, J. C. (1962). "Vocal Behavior of the Bottlenose Dolphin". Proceedings of the American Philosophical Society.

=== Books ===
- Lilly, John C. (1961). Man and Dolphin: Adventures of a New Scientific Frontier (1st ed.). Garden City, NY: Doubleday. [Reprinted 1962, Gollancz, ISBN 978-0-575-01054-3].
- Lilly, John C. (1967). The Mind of the Dolphin: A Nonhuman Intelligence (1st ed.). Garden City, NY: Doubleday. ISBN 978-0-385-02543-0.
- Lilly, John C. (1968). Programming and Metaprogramming in the Human Biocomputer: Theory and Experiments (1st ed.). Communication Research Institute. (at Internet Archive). [Reprinted 1987, Three Rivers Press/Julian Press, ISBN 978-0-517-52757-3].
- Lilly, John C. (1972). The Center of the Cyclone: An Autobiography of Inner Space (1st ed.). Julian Press. (at Internet Archive). [Reprinted 1973, Bantam Books, ISBN 978-0-553-13349-3; 2001, Marion Boyars Publishers, ISBN 978-1-84230-004-6].
- Lilly, John C. (1975). Lilly on Dolphins: Humans of the Sea. Anchor Press. ISBN 978-0-385-01037-5.
- Lilly, John C. (1975b). Simulations of God: The Science of Belief. Simon and Schuster. ISBN 978-0-671-21981-9.
- Lilly, John C. (1977). The Deep Self: Profound Relaxation and the Tank Isolation Technique (1st ed.). Simon and Schuster. ISBN 978-0-671-22552-0. [Reprinted 1981, Warner Books, ISBN 978-0-446-33023-7; 2006, Gateways Books & Tapes, ISBN 978-0-89556-116-9].
- Lilly, John C. (1978). Communication between Man and Dolphin: The Possibilities of Talking with Other Species. Julian Press. ISBN 978-0-517-56564-3.
- Lilly, John C. (1978b). The Scientist: A Novel Autobiography (1st ed.). Lippincott. ISBN 978-0-397-01274-9. [Reprinted 1981, Bantam Books, ISBN 978-0-553-12813-0].
- Lilly, John C. (1996). The Scientist: A Metaphysical Autobiography. Ronin Publishing. ISBN 978-0914171720.

==== Co-authored ====
- Lilly, John C.; Lilly, Antonietta (1976). The Dyadic Cyclone: The Autobiography of a Couple. with Antonietta Lilly (1st ed.). Simon and Schuster. ISBN 978-0-671-22218-5. [Reprinted 1978, Paladin, ISBN 978-0-586-08276-8].
- Jeffrey, Francis; Lilly, John C. (1990). John Lilly, so far-- (1st ed.). Jeremy P. Tarcher, Inc. ISBN 0-87477-539-6. An authorized biography.
- Lilly, John C.; Gold, E. J. (1995). Tanks for the Memories: Floatation Tank Talks. Gateways Books & Tapes. ISBN 978-0-89556-071-1.

== See also ==
- Anomalous experiences
- Cetacean intelligence
- John Lilly and the Earth Coincidence Control Office, a 2025 documentary film about him
