= Timothy Leary =

American psychologist (1920–1996)

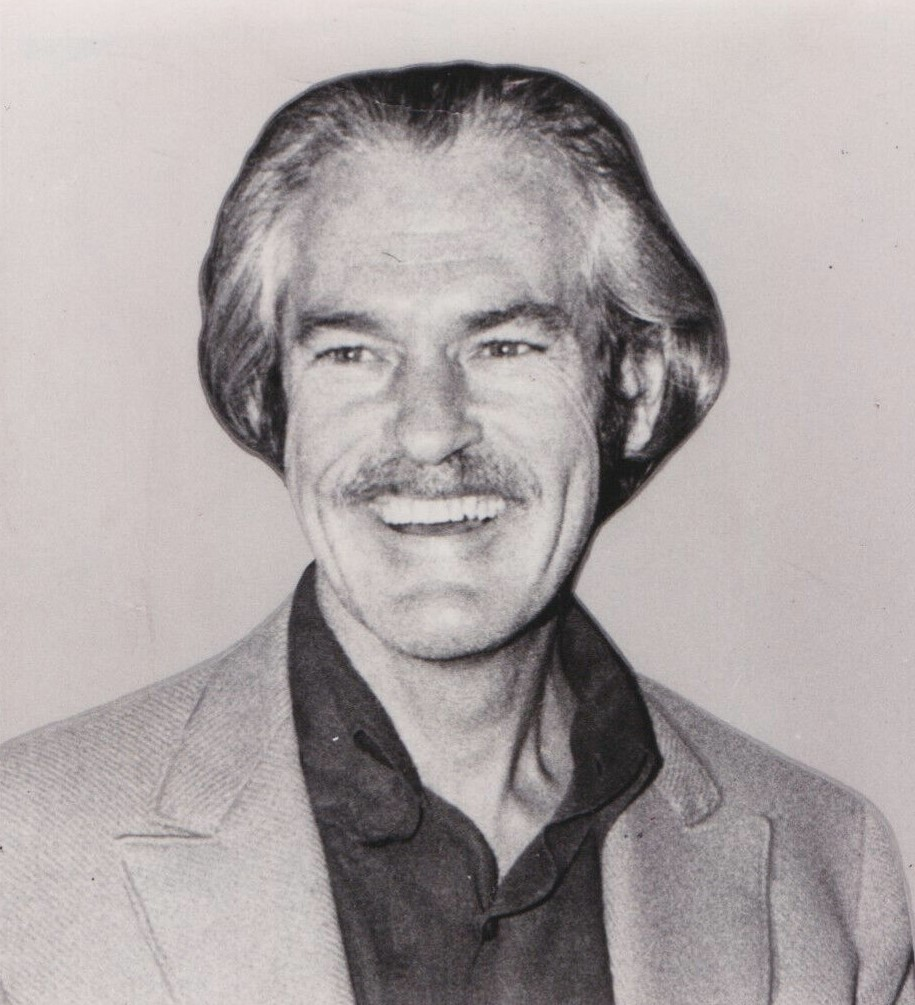
- Leary in 1970
- Born: Timothy Francis Leary; October 22, 1920; Springfield, Massachusetts, US
- Died: May 31, 1996 (aged 75); Beverly Hills, California, US
- Education: College of the Holy Cross; United States Military Academy; University of Alabama (BA); Washington State University (MS); University of California, Berkeley (PhD)
- Occupations: Psychologist; activist; author
- Known for: Eight-circuit model of consciousness; Reality tunnel; "Question authority"; "Set and setting"; "Turn on, tune in, drop out"
- Spouses: Marianne Busch (m. 1945; died 1955) Mary Della Cioppa (m. 1956; div. 1957) Nena von Schlebrügge (m. 1964; div. 1965) Rosemary Woodruff (m. 1967; div. 1976) Barbara Chase (m. 1978; div. 1992) (Note: Barbara Chase, Timothy Leary's fifth wife, is the sister of Tanya Roberts.)
- Partner: Joanna Harcourt-Smith (1972–1977)
- Children: 4
- Scientific career
- Fields: Clinical psychology; Psychotherapy; Psychedelic therapy
- Workplaces: University of California, Berkeley; Kaiser Oakland Medical Center; Harvard University
- Thesis: The Social Dimensions of Personality: Group Process and Structure (1950)
- Doctoral advisor: Hubert Stanley Coffey

Timothy Francis Leary (October 22, 1920 – May 31, 1996) was an American psychologist and author known for strongly advocating psychedelic drugs. Evaluations of Leary are polarized, ranging from "bold oracle" to "publicity hound". According to poet Allen Ginsberg, he was "a hero of American consciousness", while writer Tom Robbins called him a "brave neuronaut". President Richard Nixon disagreed, calling Leary "the most dangerous man in America". During the 1960s and 1970s, at the height of the counterculture movement, Leary was arrested 36 times.

As a clinical psychologist at Harvard University, Leary founded the Harvard Psilocybin Project after an experience with magic mushrooms he had in Mexico in 1960. For two years, he tested psilocybin's therapeutic effects, in the Concord Prison Experiment and the Marsh Chapel Experiment. He also experimented with lysergic acid diethylamide (LSD), which was then legal in the US. Other Harvard faculty questioned his research's scientific legitimacy and ethics because he took psychedelics himself along with his subjects and allegedly pressured students to join in. Harvard fired Leary and his colleague Richard Alpert (later known as Ram Dass) in May 1963. Many people learned of psychedelics after the Harvard scandal. Leary continued to publicly promote psychedelic drugs and became a well-known figure of the counterculture of the 1960s; he popularized catchphrases that promoted his philosophy, such as "turn on, tune in, drop out", "set and setting", and "think for yourself and question authority".

Leary believed that LSD showed potential for therapeutic use in psychiatry. He developed an eight-circuit model of consciousness in his 1977 book Exo-Psychology and gave lectures, occasionally calling himself a "performing philosopher". He also developed a philosophy of mind expansion and personal truth through LSD. He also wrote and spoke frequently about transhumanism, human space migration, intelligence increase, and life extension (SMI²LE).

== Early life and education ==
Leary was born in Springfield, Massachusetts, an only child in an Irish Catholic household. His father, Timothy "Tote" Leary, was a dentist who left his wife, Abigail Ferris, when Timothy was 14. He graduated from Classical High School in Springfield.

Leary attended the College of the Holy Cross in Worcester, Massachusetts from 1938 to 1940. He received a Jesuit education there and learned Latin, rhetoric, and Greek. Under pressure from his father, he left to become a cadet in the United States Military Academy. In his first months at West Point, he received numerous demerits for rule infractions and then was sanctioned for failing to report rule breaking by cadets he supervised. He was also accused of going on a drinking binge, and after failing to admit it, he was asked by the Honor Committee to resign. Leary refused and was shunned by fellow cadets. He was acquitted by a court-martial, but the silencing continued as well as the onslaught of demerits for small rule infractions. In his second year, his mother appealed to a family friend, United States Senator David I. Walsh, head of the Senate Naval Affairs Committee, who investigated personally. The Honor Committee quietly revised its position and announced that it would abide by the court-martial verdict. Leary then resigned and was honorably discharged by the Army. About 50 years later he said it was "the only fair trial I've had in a court of law".

To his family's chagrin, Leary transferred to the University of Alabama in late 1941 because it admitted him expeditiously. He enrolled in the university's ROTC program, maintained top grades, and began to cultivate academic interests in psychology (under the aegis of the Middlebury and Harvard-educated Donald Ramsdell) and biology. Leary was expelled a year later for spending a night in the female dormitory and lost his student deferment during World War II.

Leary was drafted into the United States Army and received basic training at Fort Eustis in 1943. He remained in the non-commissioned officer track while enrolled in the psychology subsection of the Army Specialized Training Program, including three months of study at Georgetown University and six months at Ohio State University. With limited need for officers late in the war, Leary was briefly assigned as a private first class to the Pacific War-bound 2d Combat Cargo Group (which he later characterized as "a suicide command ... whose main mission, as far as I could see, was to eliminate the entire civilian branch of American aviation from post-war rivalry") at Syracuse Army Air Base in Mattydale, New York. After a fateful reunion with Ramsdell (who was assigned to Deshon General Hospital in Butler, Pennsylvania, as chief psychologist) in Buffalo, New York, he was promoted to corporal and reassigned to his mentor's command as a staff psychometrician. He remained in Deshon's deaf rehabilitation clinic for the remainder of the war.

While stationed in Butler, Leary courted Marianne Busch; they married in April 1945. Leary was discharged at the rank of sergeant in January 1946, having earned such standard decorations as the Good Conduct Medal, the American Defense Service Medal, the American Campaign Medal, and the World War II Victory Medal.

As the war concluded, Leary was reinstated at UA and received credit for his Ohio State psychology coursework. He completed his degree via correspondence courses and graduated in August 1945. After receiving his undergraduate degree, Leary pursued an academic career. In 1946, he received a M.S. in psychology at the Washington State College in Pullman, where he studied under educational psychologist Lee Cronbach. His M.S. thesis was on clinical applications of the Wechsler Adult Intelligence Scale.

Marianne bore their first child, Susan, in 1947, and their son Jack arrived two years later. In 1950, Leary received a PhD in clinical psychology from the University of California, Berkeley. In the postwar era, Leary was strongly attracted to the objectivity of modern physics; his doctoral dissertation, The Social Dimensions of Personality: Group Process and Structure, approached group therapy as a "psychlotron" from which behavioral characteristics could be derived and quantified in a manner analogous to the periodic table, foreshadowing his later development of the interpersonal circumplex.

== Professorship ==
Leary stayed on in the Bay Area as an assistant clinical professor of medical psychology at the University of California, San Francisco; concurrently, he co-founded Kaiser Hospital's psychology department in Oakland and maintained a private consultancy. (Note: Higgs 2006, p. 18: "In 1954 he became Director of Psychology Research at the Kaiser Foundation Hospital, and published nearly 50 papers in psychology journals.") The Leary family spent 1952 in Spain, living on a research grant. According to Berkeley colleague Marv Freedman, "Something had been stirred in him in terms of breaking out of being another cog in society."

Leary's marriage was strained by infidelity and mutual alcohol abuse. Marianne died by suicide in 1955, leaving him to raise their son and daughter alone. He described himself during this period as "an anonymous institutional employee who drove to work each morning in a long line of commuter cars and drove home each night and drank martinis ... like several million middle-class, liberal, intellectual robots".

From 1954 or 1955 to 1958, Leary directed psychiatric research at the Kaiser Family Foundation. In 1957, he published The Interpersonal Diagnosis of Personality, which the Annual Review of Psychology called the "most important book on psychotherapy of the year".

In 1958, the National Institute of Mental Health terminated Leary's research grant after he failed to meet with a NIMH investigator. Leary and his children relocated to Europe, where he attempted to write his next book while subsisting on small grants and insurance policies. His stay in Florence was unproductive and indigent, prompting a return to academia.

In late 1959, Leary moved to Newton, Massachusetts, and became a lecturer in clinical psychology at Harvard University at the behest of Frank Barron (a colleague from Berkeley) and David McClelland. In addition to teaching, Leary was affiliated with the Harvard Center for Research in Personality under McClelland. He oversaw the Harvard Psilocybin Project and conducted experiments in conjunction with assistant professor Richard Alpert. In 1963, Leary was terminated for failing to attend scheduled class lectures, though he maintained that he had met his teaching obligations. The decision to dismiss him may have been influenced by his promotion of psychedelic drug use among Harvard students and faculty. The drugs were legal at the time.

Leary's work in academic psychology expanded on the research of Harry Stack Sullivan and Karen Horney, which sought to better understand interpersonal processes to help diagnose personality disorders. Leary's dissertation developed the interpersonal circumplex model, later published in The Interpersonal Diagnosis of Personality. The book demonstrated how psychologists could use Minnesota Multiphasic Personality Inventory (MMPI) scores to predict how respondents might react to various interpersonal situations. Leary's research was an important harbinger of transactional analysis, directly prefiguring the popular work of Eric Berne.

== Psychedelic experiments and experiences ==
=== Mexico and Harvard research (1957–1963) ===
==== Introduction to psychedelic mushrooms ====
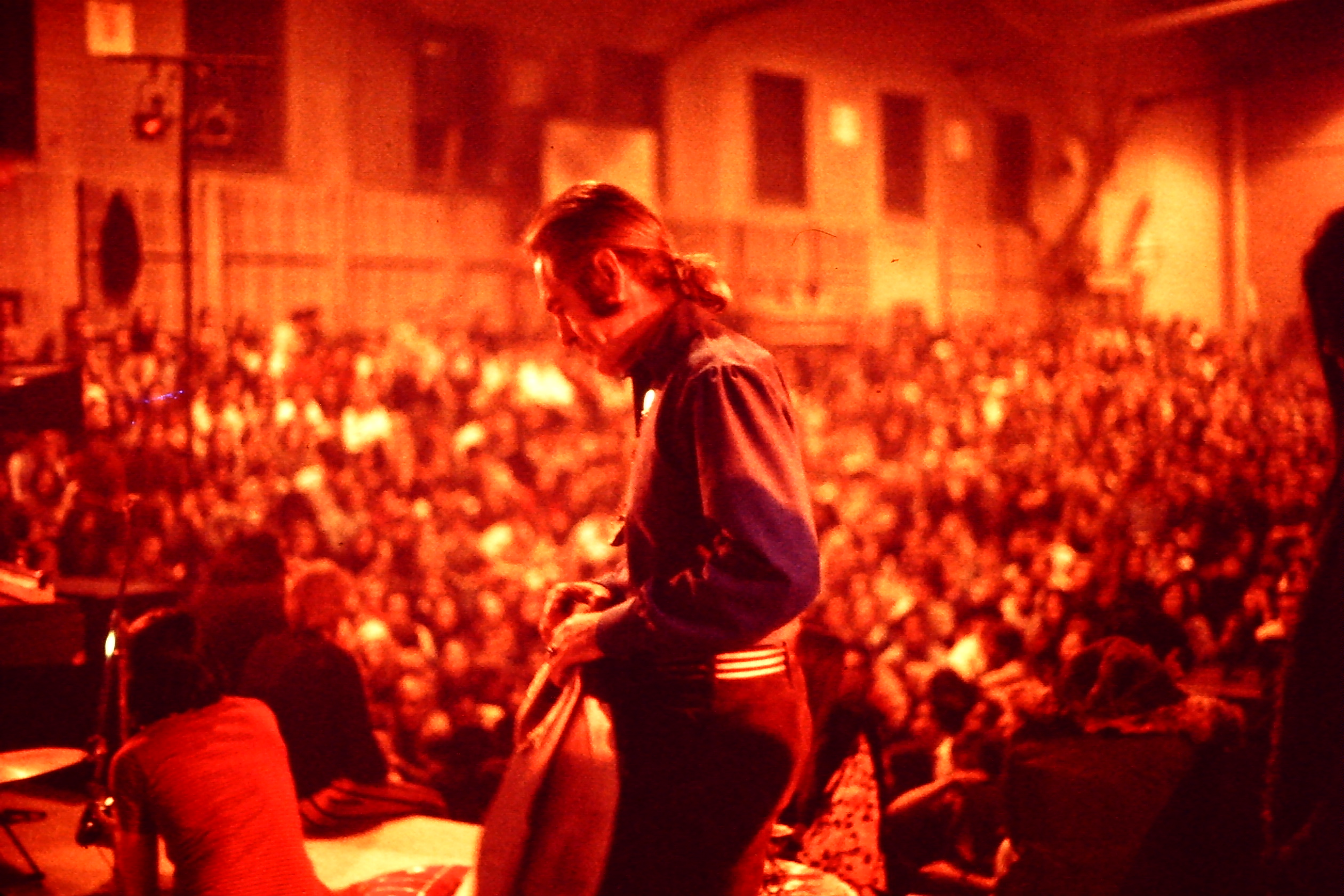
Leary at the State University of New York at Buffalo during a lecture tour in 1969

On May 13, 1957, Life magazine published "Seeking the Magic Mushroom", an article by R. Gordon Wasson about the use of psilocybin mushrooms in religious rites of the Mazatec Indians of Mexico. Anthony Russo, a colleague of Leary's, had experimented with psychedelic Psilocybe mexicana mushrooms on a trip to Mexico and told Leary about it. In August 1960, Leary traveled to Cuernavaca, Mexico, with Russo and consumed psilocybin mushrooms for the first time, an experience that drastically altered the course of his life. In 1965, Leary said that he had "learned more about ... [his] brain and its possibilities ... [and] more about psychology in the five hours after taking these mushrooms than ... in the preceding 15 years of studying and doing research".

After talking with Aldous Huxley in 1960, Leary became convinced that mushrooms are beneficial to mental health. The British occultist Aleister Crowley also had a significant influence on him, and Leary believed he was continuing Crowley's work to "bring about a fundamental shift in human consciousness". In an interview in the 1970s, he said: "I've been an admirer of Aleister Crowley and I think I've carried on much of the work that he started over a hundred years ago and carried on into the sixties themselves." Leary also believed that he was guided by higher intelligences.

Back at Harvard, Leary and his associates (notably Alpert) began a research program known as the Harvard Psilocybin Project. The goal was to analyze psilocybin's effects on human subjects (first prisoners, and later Andover Newton Theological Seminary students) from a synthesized version of the drug, one of two active compounds found in a wide variety of hallucinogenic mushrooms, including Psilocybe mexicana. Psilocybin was produced in a process developed by Albert Hofmann of Sandoz Pharmaceuticals, who was famous for synthesizing LSD.

Beat poet Allen Ginsberg heard about the Harvard research project and asked to join. Leary was inspired by Ginsberg's enthusiasm, and the two shared an optimism that psychedelics could help people discover a higher level of consciousness. The Village Voice published an article titled "Allen Ginsberg Explains Timothy Leary", in which Ginsberg calls Leary as a "hero of American consciousness". They began introducing psychedelics to intellectuals and artists including Jack Kerouac, Maynard Ferguson, Charles Mingus, and Charles Olson.

==== Concord Prison Experiment ====
Leary argued that psychedelic substances—in proper doses, a stable setting, and under the guidance of psychologists—could benefit behavior in ways not easily obtained by regular therapy. He experimented in treating alcoholism and reforming criminals, and many of his subjects said they had profound mystical and spiritual experiences that permanently improved their lives.

The Concord Prison Experiment evaluated the use of psilocybin and psychotherapy in the rehabilitation of released prisoners. Thirty-six prisoners were reported to have repented and sworn off criminality after Leary and his associates guided them through the psychedelic experience. The overall recidivism rate for American prisoners was 60%, whereas the rate for those in Leary's project reportedly dropped to 20%. The experimenters concluded that long-term reduction in criminal recidivism could be effected with a combination of psilocybin-assisted group psychotherapy (inside the prison) along with a comprehensive post-release follow-up support program modeled on Alcoholics Anonymous.

==== Dissension over studies ====
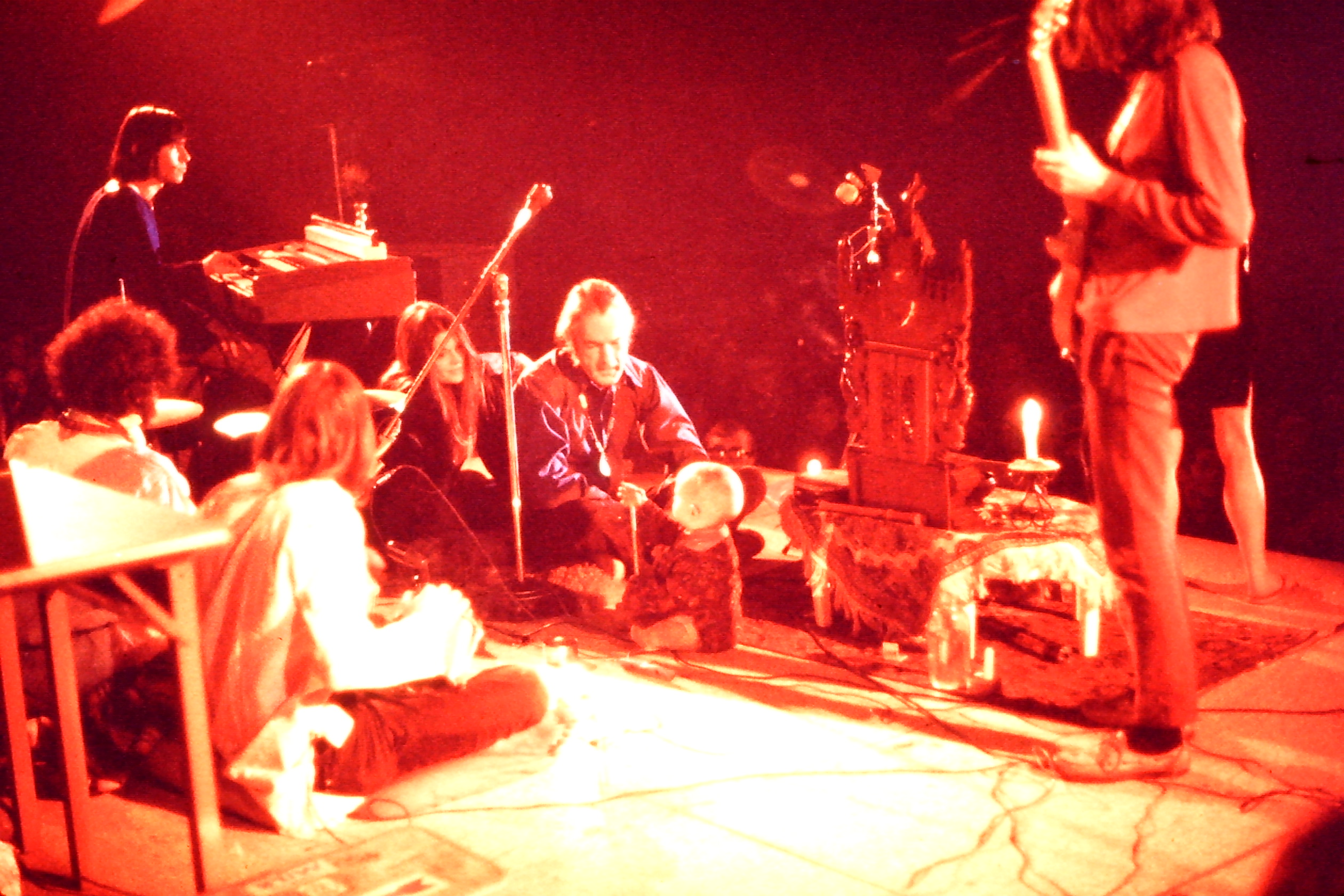
Timothy Leary, family, and band at the State University of New York at Buffalo during his 1969 lecture tour

The Concord conclusions were contested in a follow-up study on the basis of time differences monitoring the study group vs. the control group and differences between subjects reincarcerated for parole violations or for new crimes. The researchers concluded that statistically only a slight improvement could be attributed to psilocybin, in contrast to the significant improvement reported by Leary and his colleagues. Rick Doblin suggested that Leary had fallen prey to the halo effect, skewing the results and clinical conclusions. Doblin further accused Leary of lacking "a higher standard" or "highest ethical standards in order to regain the trust of regulators". Ralph Metzner rebuked Doblin for these assertions: "In my opinion, the existing accepted standards of honesty and truthfulness are perfectly adequate. We have those standards, not to curry favor with regulators, but because it is the agreement within the scientific community that observations should be reported accurately and completely. There is no proof in any of this re-analysis that Leary unethically manipulated his data."

Leary and Alpert founded the International Federation for Internal Freedom (IFIF) in 1962 in Cambridge, Massachusetts, to carry out studies in the religious use of psychedelic drugs. This was run by Lisa Bieberman (now known as Licia Kuenning), a friend of Leary. The Harvard Crimson called her a "disciple" who ran a Psychedelic Information Center out of her home and published a national LSD newspaper. That publication was actually Leary and Alpert's journal Psychedelic Review and Bieberman (a graduate of the Radcliffe Institute for Advanced Study at Harvard, who had volunteered for Leary as a student) was its circulation manager. Leary's and Alpert's research attracted so much attention that many who wanted to participate in the experiments had to be turned away. To satisfy the curiosity of those who were turned away, a black market for psychedelics sprang up near the Harvard campus.

==== Firing by Harvard ====
Other professors in the Harvard Center for Research in Personality raised concerns about the experiments' legitimacy and safety. Leary and Alpert taught a class that was required for graduation and colleagues felt they were abusing their power by pressuring graduate students to take hallucinogens in the experiments. Leary and Alpert also violated policy by giving psychedelics to undergraduate students and failing to select participants through random sampling. It was also ethically questionable that the researchers sometimes took hallucinogens along with the subjects they were studying. These concerns were printed in The Harvard Crimson, leading the university to halt the experiments. The Massachusetts Department of Public Health launched an investigation that was later dropped, but the university eventually fired Leary and Alpert.

According to Andrew Weil, Leary (who was not tenured) was fired for missing his scheduled lectures, while Alpert (a tenure-track assistant professor) was dismissed for allegedly giving an undergraduate psilocybin in an off-campus apartment. Harvard President Nathan Pusey released a statement on May 27, 1963, reporting that Leary had left campus without authorization and "failed to keep his classroom appointments". His salary was terminated on April 30, 1963.

=== Millbrook and psychedelic counterculture (1963–1967) ===
Leary's psychedelic experimentation attracted the attention of three heirs to the Mellon fortune, siblings Peggy, Billy, and Tommy Hitchcock. In 1963, they gave Leary and his associates access to a sprawling 64-room mansion on an estate in Millbrook, New York, where they continued their psychedelic sessions. Peggy directed the International Federation for Internal Freedom (IFIF)'s New York branch, and Billy rented the estate to IFIF. Peggy persuaded her brothers to let Leary rent a room at the mansion. Leary and Alpert set up a communal group with former Psilocybin Project members at the Hitchcock Estate (commonly known as "Millbrook"). One of the IFIF's founding board members, Paul Lee, a Harvard theologian, a participant at Marsh Chapel and a member of the Leary circle, said of the group's formation:

There was a big discussion about whether to go underground with it and make it a kind of secret initiation issue, or go public. But Leary was an Irish revolutionary and he wanted to shout it from the rooftops. So it went that way. It simply became a tsunami.

The IFIF was reconstituted as the Castalia Foundation after the intellectual colony in Hermann Hesse's 1943 novel The Glass Bead Game. The Castalia group's journal was the Psychedelic Review. The core group at Millbrook wanted to cultivate the divinity within each person and regularly joined LSD sessions facilitated by Leary. The Castalia Foundation also hosted non-drug weekend retreats for meditation, yoga, and group therapy. Leary later wrote:

We saw ourselves as anthropologists from the 21st century inhabiting a time module set somewhere in the dark ages of the 1960s. On this space colony we were attempting to create a new paganism and a new dedication to life as art.

Lucy Sante of The New York Times later described the Millbrook estate as:

the headquarters of Leary and gang for the better part of five years, a period filled with endless parties, epiphanies and breakdowns, emotional dramas of all sizes, and numerous raids and arrests, many of them on flimsy charges concocted by the local assistant district attorney, G. Gordon Liddy.

Others contest the characterization of Millbrook as a party house. In The Electric Kool-Aid Acid Test, Tom Wolfe portrays Leary as using psychedelics only for research, not recreation. When Ken Kesey's Merry Pranksters visited the estate, they received a frosty reception. Leary had the flu and did not play host. After a private meeting with Kesey and Ken Babbs in his room, he promised to remain an ally in the years ahead.

In 1964, Leary, Alpert, and Ralph Metzner coauthored The Psychedelic Experience, based on the Tibetan Book of the Dead. In it, they wrote:

A psychedelic experience is a journey to new realms of consciousness. The scope and content of the experience is limitless, but its characteristic features are the transcendence of verbal concepts, of spacetime dimensions, and of the ego or identity. Such experiences of enlarged consciousness can occur in a variety of ways: sensory deprivation, yoga exercises, disciplined meditation, religious or aesthetic ecstasies, or spontaneously. Most recently they have become available to anyone through the ingestion of psychedelic drugs such as LSD, psilocybin, mescaline, DMT, etc. Of course, the drug does not produce the transcendent experience. It merely acts as a chemical key—it opens the mind, frees the nervous system of its ordinary patterns and structures.

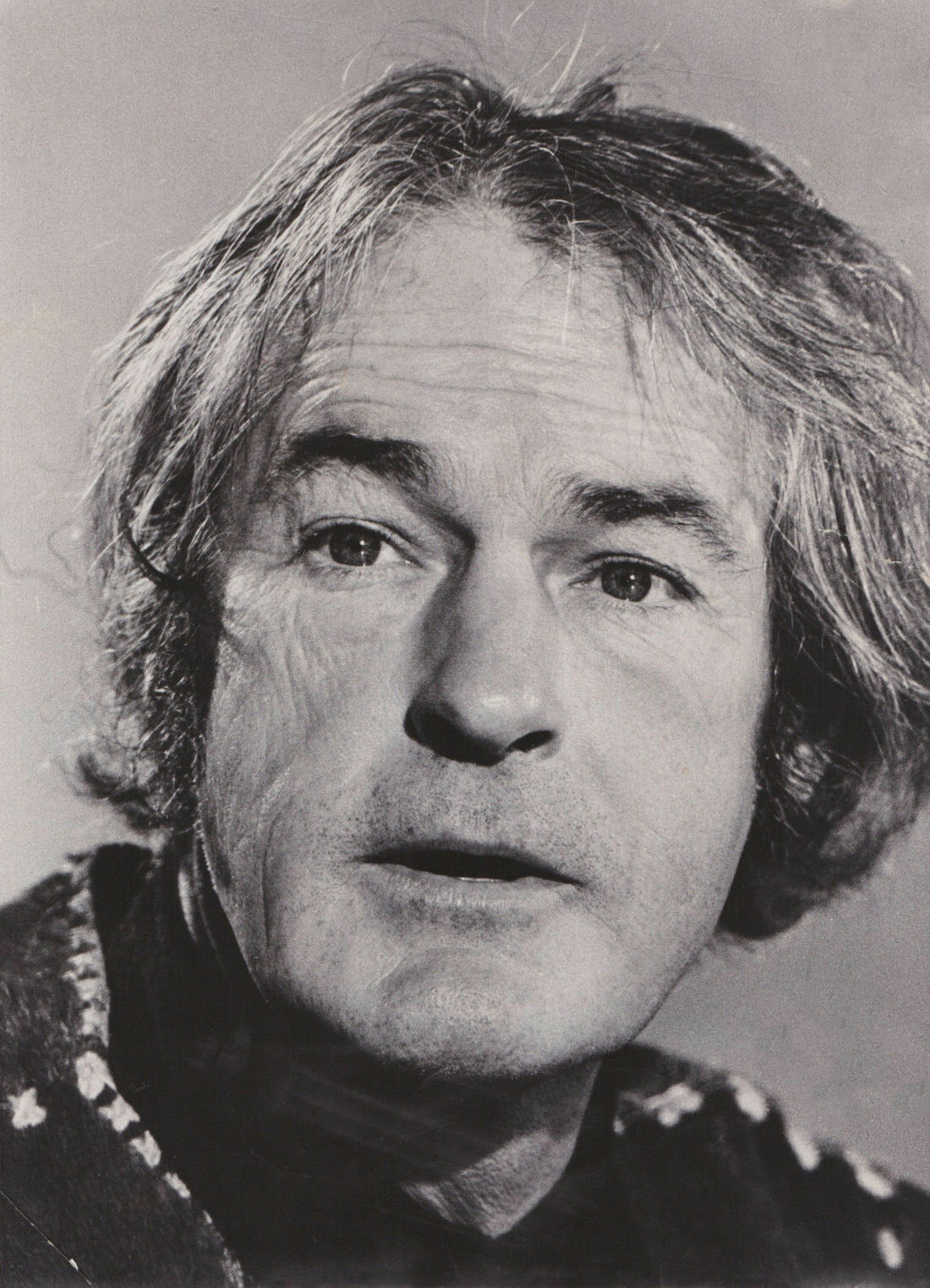
Leary in 1969

Leary's research was rumored to be linked to the CIA, which allegedly provided funding. The CIA was greatly interested in the effects of mind-altering drugs in the 1960s, and its drug research was incorporated into the controversial MKUltra experiments. According to Walter Bowart, Leary admitted to working for the CIA since 1962 as "an important national asset." He was quoted by Bowart as follows:

I would say that eighty percent of my movements, eighty percent of the decisions I made were suggested to me by CIA people... I like the CIA! The game they're playing is better than the FBI. Better than the Saigon police. Better than Franco's police. Better than the Israeli police. They're a thousand times better than the KGB. So it comes down to: who are you going to work for? The Yankees or the Dodgers?

Leary married model Birgitte Caroline "Nena" von Schlebrügge in 1964 at Millbrook. Both Nena and her brother Bjorn were friends of the Hitchcocks. D. A. Pennebaker, also a Hitchcock friend, and cinematographer Nicholas Proferes documented the event in the short film You're Nobody Till Somebody Loves You. Charles Mingus played piano. The marriage lasted a year before von Schlebrügge divorced Leary in 1965. She married Indo-Tibetan Buddhist scholar and ex-monk Robert Thurman in 1967 and gave birth to Ganden Thurman that year. Actress Uma Thurman, her second child, was born in 1970.

Leary met Rosemary Woodruff in 1965 at a New York City art exhibit, and invited her to Millbrook. After moving in, she co-edited the manuscript of Leary's 1966 book Psychedelic Prayers: And Other Meditations with Ralph Metzner and Michael Horowitz. The poems in the book were inspired by the Tao Te Ching, and meant to be used as an aid to LSD trips. Woodruff helped Leary prepare weekend multimedia workshops simulating the psychedelic experience, which were presented around the East Coast.

In September 1966, Leary said in a Playboy magazine interview that LSD could cure homosexuality. According to him, a lesbian became heterosexual after using the drug. Like most of the psychiatric field, he later decided that homosexuality was not an illness. (Note: Leary 1982, p. 256: "Since homosexuality has always been a part of every society, you have to assume that there is something necessary, correct and valid - genetically natural - about it.")

By 1966, use of psychedelics by America's youth had reached such proportions that serious concern about the drugs and their effect on American culture was expressed in the national press and halls of government. Senator Thomas Dodd convened Senate subcommittee hearings to try to better understand the drug-use phenomenon, eventually with the intention of "stamping out" such usage by criminalizing it. Leary was one of several expert witnesses called to testify at these hearings. In his testimony, Leary said, "the challenge of the psychedelic chemicals is not just how to control them, but how to use them." He implored the subcommittee not to criminalize psychedelic drug use, which he felt would only increase its usage among American youth while removing the safeguards that controlled "set and setting" provided. When subcommittee member Ted Kennedy asked Leary whether LSD usage was "extremely dangerous", Leary replied, "Sir, the motorcar is dangerous if used improperly...Human stupidity and ignorance is the only danger human beings face in this world." To conclude his testimony, Leary suggested that legislation be enacted that would require LSD users to be competently trained and licensed adults, so that LSD could be used "for serious purposes, such as spiritual growth, pursuit of knowledge, or their own personal development." He argued that without such licensing, the US would face "another era of prohibition." Leary's testimony was ineffective; on October 6, 1966, just months after the subcommittee hearings, LSD was banned in California, and by October 1968, it was banned nationwide by the Staggers-Dodd Bill.

In 1966, Folkways Records recorded Leary reading from his book The Psychedelic Experience, and released the album The Psychedelic Experience: Readings from the Book "The Psychedelic Experience. A Manual Based on the Tibetan...".

On September 19, 1966, Leary reorganized the IFIF/Castalia Foundation under the name the League for Spiritual Discovery, a religion with LSD as its holy sacrament, in part as an unsuccessful attempt to maintain legal status for the use of LSD and other psychedelics for the religion's adherents, based on a "freedom of religion" argument. Leary incorporated the League for Spiritual Discovery as a religious organization in New York State, and its dogma was based on Leary's mantra: "drop out, turn on, tune in". (The Brotherhood of Eternal Love later considered Leary its spiritual leader, but it did not develop out of the IFIF.) Nicholas Sand, the clandestine chemist for the Brotherhood of Eternal Love, followed Leary to Millbrook, joined the League for Spiritual Discovery, and was designated its "alchemist". At the end of 1966, Nina Graboi, a friend and colleague of Leary's who had spent time with him at Millbrook, became the director of the Center for the League of Spiritual Discovery in Greenwich Village. The Center opened in March 1967. Leary and Alpert gave free weekly talks there; other guest speakers included Ralph Metzner and Allen Ginsberg. Leary's papers at the New York Public Library include complete records of the IFIF, the Castalia Foundation, and the League for Spiritual Discovery.

In late 1966 and early 1967, Leary toured college campuses presenting a multimedia performance called "The Death of the Mind", attempting an artistic replication of the LSD experience. He said the League for Spiritual Discovery was limited to 360 members and was already at its limit, but encouraged others to form their own psychedelic religions. He published a pamphlet in 1967 called Start Your Own Religion to encourage people to do so.

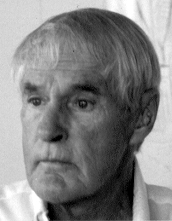
Leary in 1989

Leary was invited to attend the January 14, 1967 Human Be-In by Michael Bowen, the primary organizer of the event, a gathering of 30,000 hippies in San Francisco's Golden Gate Park. In speaking to the group, Leary coined the famous phrase "Turn on, tune in, drop out". In a 1988 interview with Neil Strauss, he said the slogan was "given to him" by Marshall McLuhan when the two had lunch in New York City, adding, "Marshall was very much interested in ideas and marketing, and he started singing something like, 'Psychedelics hit the spot / Five hundred micrograms, that's a lot,' to the tune of [the well-known Pepsi 1950s singing commercial]. Then he started going, 'Tune in, turn on, and drop out.'" Though the more popular "turn on, tune in, drop out" became synonymous with Leary, his actual definition with the League for Spiritual Discovery was: "Drop Out—detach yourself from the external social drama which is as dehydrated and ersatz as TV. Turn On—find a sacrament which returns you to the temple of God, your own body. Go out of your mind. Get high. Tune In—be reborn. Drop back in to express it. Start a new sequence of behavior that reflects your vision."

Repeated FBI raids ended the Millbrook era. Leary told author and Prankster Paul Krassner of a 1966 raid by Liddy, "He was a government agent entering our bedroom at midnight. We had every right to shoot him. But I've never owned a weapon in my life. I have never had and never will have a gun around."

In November 1967, Leary engaged in a televised debate on drug use with MIT professor Jerry Lettvin.

=== Post-Millbrook ===
At the end of 1967, Leary moved to Laguna Beach, California, and made many friends in Hollywood. "When he married his third wife, Rosemary Woodruff, in 1967, the event was directed by Ted Markland of Bonanza. All the guests were on acid."

In the late 1960s and early 1970s, Leary formulated what became his eight-circuit model of consciousness in collaboration with writer Brian Barritt. The essay "The Seven Tongues of God" claimed that human brains have seven circuits producing seven levels of consciousness. This later became seven circuits in Leary's 1973 monograph Neurologic, which he wrote while he was in prison. The eight-circuit idea was not exhaustively formulated until the publication of Exo-Psychology by Leary and Robert Anton Wilson's Cosmic Trigger in 1977. Wilson contributed to the model after befriending Leary in the early 1970s, and used it as a framework for further exposition in his book Prometheus Rising, among other works. (Note: Wilson 2000, p. 6: "The eight-circuit model of consciousness in this book and much of its future-vision derive from the writings of Dr. Timothy Leary, whose letters and conversations have also influenced many other ideas herein.")

Leary believed that the first four of these circuits ("the Larval Circuits" or "Terrestrial Circuits") are naturally accessed by most people at transition points in life such as puberty. The second four circuits ("the Stellar Circuits" or "Extra-Terrestrial Circuits"), Leary wrote, were "evolutionary offshoots" of the first four that would be triggered at transition points as humans evolve further. These circuits, according to Leary, would equip humans to live in space and expand consciousness for further scientific and social progress. Leary suggested that some people might trigger these circuits sooner through meditation, yoga, or psychedelic drugs specific to each circuit. He suggested that the feelings of floating and uninhibited motion sometimes experienced with marijuana demonstrated the purpose of the higher four circuits. The function of the fifth circuit was to accustom humans to life at a zero gravity environment. Leary did not specify the location of the eight circuits in any brain structures, neural organization, or chemical pathways. He wrote that a higher intelligence "located in interstellar nuclear-gravitational-quantum structures" gave humans the eight circuits. A "U.F.O. message" was encoded in human DNA.

Many researchers believed that Leary provided little scientific evidence for his claims. Even before he began working on psychedelics, he was known as a theoretician rather than a data collector. His most ambitious pre-psychedelic work was Interpersonal Diagnosis Of Personality. The reviewer for The British Medical Journal, H. J. Eysenck, wrote that Leary created a confusing and overly broad rubric for testing psychiatric conditions. "Perhaps the worst failing of the book is the omission of any kind of proof for the validity and reliability of the diagnostic system," Eysenck wrote. "It is simply not enough to say" that the accuracy of the system "can be checked by the reader" in clinical practice. In 1965, Leary co-edited The Psychedelic Reader. Penn State psychology researcher Jerome E. Singer reviewed the book and singled out Leary as the worst offender in a work containing "melanges of hucksterism". In place of scientific data about the effects of LSD, Leary used metaphors about "galaxies spinning" faster than the speed of light and a cerebral cortex "turned on to a much higher voltage".

== Legal troubles ==
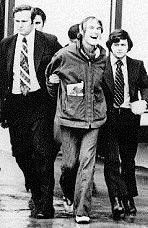
BNDD agents Howard Safir and Don Strange arrest Leary in 1972.

Leary's first run-in with the law came on December 23, 1965, when he was arrested for marijuana possession. On December 20, 1965, Leary took his two children, Jack and Susan, and his girlfriend Rosemary Woodruff to Mexico for a month-long vacation to rest and write an autobiography. Two days later they had crossed into Nuevo Laredo, Mexico, in the late afternoon and discovered that they would have to wait until morning for the appropriate visa for an extended stay. They decided to cross back into Texas to spend the night, and were on the US–Mexico bridge when Rosemary remembered that she had a small amount of marijuana in her possession. It was impossible to throw it out on the bridge, so Susan put it in her clothes. On their return from Mexico to the United States, the United States Customs Service found a silver snuffbox with marijuana on Susan. After taking responsibility for the controlled substance, Leary was convicted of possession under the Marihuana Tax Act of 1937 on March 11, 1966, sentenced to 30 years in prison, fined $30,000, and ordered to undergo psychiatric treatment. He appealed the case on the basis that the Marihuana Tax Act was unconstitutional, as it required a degree of self-incrimination in blatant violation of the Fifth Amendment.

On December 26, 1968, Leary was arrested again in Laguna Beach, California, this time for the possession of two marijuana "roaches". Leary alleged that they were planted by the arresting officer, but was convicted of the crime. On May 19, 1969, the Supreme Court concurred with Leary in Leary v. United States, declared the Marihuana Tax Act unconstitutional, and overturned his 1966 conviction. (Note: Higgs 2006, p. 99: "His lawyers took the appeal against the Laredo arrest all the way to the Supreme Court, and on May 19, 1969 succeeded in getting the antiquated marijuana tax law declared unconstitutional.")

On that same day, Leary announced his candidacy for governor of California against the Republican incumbent, Ronald Reagan. His campaign slogan was "Come together, join the party." On June 1, 1969, Leary joined John Lennon and Yoko Ono at their Montreal bed-in, and Lennon subsequently wrote Leary a campaign song called "Come Together".

In July 1969, Charlene Almeida, a friend of Leary's daughter, drowned in a pond on The Brotherhood of Eternal Love's ranch (near Idyllwild, California) while under the influence of LSD. Leary was charged with contributing to the delinquency of a minor.

On March 21, 1970, Leary received a ten-year sentence for his 1968 offense. A few weeks earlier, he had been sentenced to 10 years for his 1965 arrest, for a total of 20 years to be served consecutively. In prison, he was given psychological tests used to assign inmates to appropriate work details. Having designed some of these tests himself (including the "Leary Interpersonal Behavior Inventory"), Leary answered them in such a way that he seemed to be a conforming, conventional person with a great interest in forestry and gardening. As a result, he was assigned to work as a gardener in a lower-security prison from which he escaped in September 1970, saying that his nonviolent escape was a humorous prank and leaving a challenging note for the authorities to find after he was gone.

For a fee of $25,000, paid by The Brotherhood of Eternal Love, the Weathermen smuggled Leary out of prison in a pickup truck driven by Clayton Van Lydegraf. The truck met Leary after he had escaped over the prison wall by climbing along a telephone wire. The Weathermen then helped both Leary and Rosemary out of the US and eventually into Algeria. He sought the patronage of Eldridge Cleaver for $10,000 and the remnants of the Black Panther Party's "government in exile" in Algeria, but after a short stay with them said that Cleaver had attempted to hold him and his wife hostage. Cleaver had put Leary and his wife under "house arrest" due to exasperation with their socialite lifestyle.

In 1971, the couple fled to Switzerland, where they were sheltered and effectively imprisoned by a high-living arms dealer, Michel Hauchard, who said he had an "obligation as a gentleman to protect philosophers"; Hauchard intended to broker a surreptitious film deal, and forced Leary to assign his future earnings (which Leary eventually won back). In 1972, Nixon's attorney general, John Mitchell, persuaded the Swiss government to imprison Leary, which it did for a month, but it refused to extradite him to the US.

Leary and Rosemary separated later that year; she traveled widely, then moved back to the US, where she lived as a fugitive until the 1990s. Shortly after separating from Rosemary, Leary became involved with Swiss-born British socialite Joanna Harcourt-Smith, a stepdaughter of financier Árpád Plesch and ex-girlfriend of Hauchard. The couple married in a hotel under the influence of cocaine and LSD two weeks after they were introduced, and Harcourt-Smith used his surname until they broke up in 1977. They traveled to Vienna, then Beirut, and finally Kabul, Afghanistan, in 1972; according to Lucy Sante, "Afghanistan had no extradition treaty with the United States, but this stricture did not apply to American airliners." American authorities used that interpretation of the law to interdict Leary. "Before Leary could deplane, he was arrested by an agent of the federal Bureau of Narcotics and Dangerous Drugs." Leary asserted a different story on appeal before the California Court of Appeal for the Second District:

He testified further that he had a valid passport in Kabul and that it was confiscated while he was in a line at the American Embassy in Kabul a few days prior to the day when he boarded the airplane; after his passport was confiscated, he was taken to "Central Police Headquarters"; he did not attempt to contact the American Embassy; the Kabul police held him in custody and took him to a "police hotel". The cousin of the King of Afghanistan came to see him and told him that it was a national holiday, that the King and the officials were out of Kabul, and that he (the cousin) would get a lawyer and see that Leary "had a hearing". On the morning the airplane left Kabul, officials of Afghanistan told him he was to leave Afghanistan. Leary replied he would not leave without a hearing and until he got his passport back; they said the Americans had his passport, and he was taken to the airplane.

Leary's bail was set at $5 million. The judge at his remand hearing said, "If he is allowed to travel freely, he will speak publicly and spread his ideas". Facing 95 years in prison, Leary hired criminal defense attorney Bruce Margolin. Leary mostly directed his own defense strategy, which proved unsuccessful: the jury convicted him after deliberating for less than two hours. Leary received five years for his prison escape, added to his original 10-year sentence. In 1973, he was sent to Folsom Prison in California and put in solitary confinement. While in Folsom, he was placed in a cell next to Charles Manson's. They could not see each other, but they could talk. In their discussions, Manson found it difficult to understand why Leary had given people LSD without trying to control them. At one point, Manson said to Leary, "They took you off the streets so that I could continue with your work."

Leary became an FBI informant to shorten his prison sentence and entered the witness protection program upon his release in 1976. He claimed that he feigned cooperation with the FBI investigation of the Weathermen by providing information they already had or that was of little consequence. The FBI gave him the code name "Charlie Thrush". In a 1974 news conference, Allen Ginsberg, Ram Dass, and Leary's 25-year-old son Jack denounced Leary, calling him a "cop informant", "liar", and "paranoid schizophrenic". No prosecutions stemmed from his FBI reporting. In 1999, a letter from 22 "Friends of Timothy Leary" sought to soften impressions of the FBI episode. It was signed by authors such as Douglas Rushkoff, Ken Kesey. and Robert Anton Wilson. Susan Sarandon, Genesis P-Orridge and Leary's goddaughter Winona Ryder also signed. The letter said that Leary had smuggled a message to the Weather Underground informing it "that he was considering making a deal with the FBI" and he then "waited for their approval". The reported reply was, "We understand." The letter writers did not provide confirmation that the Weather Underground okayed his cooperation with the FBI.

While in prison, Leary was sued by the parents of Vernon Powell Cox, who had jumped from a third-story window of a Berkeley apartment while under the influence of LSD, after attending a lecture by Leary promoting LSD use. Leary could not appear due to his incarceration, and could not arrange for legal representation; a default judgment was entered against him in the amount of $100,000.

== Post-prison ==
On April 21, 1976, Governor Jerry Brown released Leary from prison. After briefly relocating to Santa Fe, New Mexico, with Harcourt-Smith under the auspices of the United States Federal Witness Protection Program, the couple separated in early 1977.

=== Personal life ===
Leary then moved to Los Angeles's Laurel Canyon neighborhood, where he resided for the rest of his life. In 1978, he married filmmaker Barbara Blum, also known as Barbara Chase, sister of actress Tanya Roberts. He adopted Blum's young son and raised him as his own. He also took on several godchildren, including Winona Ryder (the daughter of his archivist Michael D. Horowitz) and technologist Joi Ito.

In January 1989, Leary's daughter Susan, then 41, was arrested in Los Angeles for non-fatally shooting her boyfriend in the head as he slept in December 1988. She was ruled mentally unfit to stand trial for attempted murder on two occasions. After years of mental instability, she died by suicide in jail in September 1990.

Although he considered her the "great love of his life", Leary and Barbara divorced in 1992; according to friend and collaborator John Perry Barlow, "Tim basically gave me permission to be her lover. He couldn't be for her what she needed sexually, so it made more sense for him to anoint someone to do that for him." Thereafter, he ensconced himself in a diverse circle of prominent figures, including Johnny Depp, Susan Sarandon, Dan Aykroyd, Douglas Rushkoff, and Spin magazine publisher Bob Guccione, Jr. Despite declining health, he maintained a regular schedule of public appearances through 1994. (Note: Higgs 2006, p. 268: "The last 17 months of Tim's life were a flurry of activity. There were records to be made, documentaries to film… and countless personal appearances. A stream of press flocked to his door.") Reflecting a modicum of political rehabilitation after several failed attempts to adapt Flashbacks as a film or television miniseries, he was the subject of an American Psychological Association symposium that year.

=== Career ===
Unable to secure a conventional academic, research, or clinical appointment due to his reputation, he continued to publish books through the independent press while maintaining an upper middle class lifestyle by making paid appearances at colleges and nightclubs as a self-described "stand-up philosopher".

Leary developed a partnership with former Millbrook-era foe G. Gordon Liddy, the Watergate burglar and conservative radio talk-show host. They toured the lecture circuit in 1982 as ex-cons debating a range of issues, including gay rights, abortion, welfare and the environment. Leary generally espoused left-wing views and Liddy generally espoused right-wing perspectives. The tour generated massive publicity and considerable funds for both. The 1983 documentary Return Engagement chronicled the tour and the release of Flashbacks, Leary's long-germinating memoir; biographer Robert Greenfield has since asserted that much of what Leary "reported as fact in Flashbacks is pure fantasy".

Leary's extensive touring on the lecture circuit continued to ensure his family a comfortable lifestyle in the mid-1980s. He associated with a variety of cultural figures, including longtime interlocutors Robert Anton Wilson and Allen Ginsberg; science fiction writers William Gibson and Norman Spinrad; and rock musicians David Byrne and John Frusciante. In addition, he appeared in Johnny Depp's and Gibby Haynes's 1994 film Stuff, which chronicled Frusciante's squalid living conditions at that time.

=== Political activism ===
On September 25, 1988, Leary held a fundraiser for Libertarian Party presidential candidate Ron Paul. Journalist Debra Saunders attended and wrote about her experience.

=== Drug use ===
Leary continued to take a wide array of drugs (ranging from serotonergic psychedelics to the nascent empathogen MDMA and alcohol and heroin) in private, but consciously eschewed proselytizing substances in media appearances amid the escalation of the war on drugs during the presidency of Ronald Reagan. Instead, he served as a prominent advocate for space colonization and life extension.

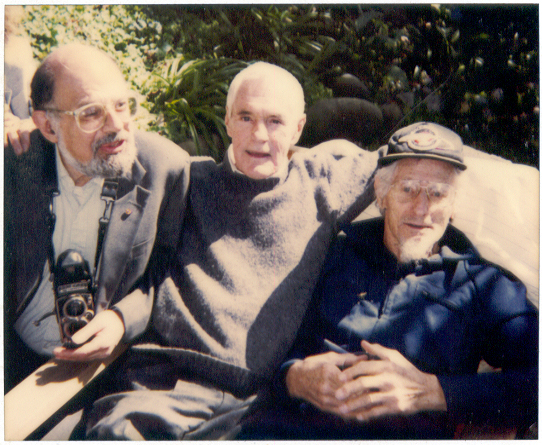
Allen Ginsberg, Timothy Leary, and John C. Lilly in 1991

=== Cultural influence ===
Leary expounded on the eight-circuit model of consciousness in books such as Info-Psychology: A Re-Vision of Exo-Psychology. He invented the acronym "SMI²LE" as a succinct summary of his pre-transhumanist agenda: SM (space migration) + I² (intelligence increase) + LE (life extension). His space colonization plan evolved over the years. Initially, 5,000 of Earth's most virile and intelligent individuals would be launched on a vessel (Starseed 1) equipped with luxurious amenities. This idea was inspired by musician Paul Kantner's 1970 concept album Blows Against The Empire, which was derived from Robert A. Heinlein's Lazarus Long series. While incarcerated in Folsom State Prison during the winter of 1975–76, he became enamored of Princeton University physicist Gerard K. O'Neill's plans to construct giant Eden-like High Orbital Mini-Earths, as documented in the Robert Anton Wilson lecture H.O.M.E.s on LaGrange, using raw materials from the Moon, orbital rock, and obsolete satellites. (Note: Leary 1982, p. 231: "O'Neill's proposal for mini-Earths was obviously the next step in human evolution...")

In the 1980s, Leary became fascinated by computers, the internet, and virtual reality. He proclaimed that "the PC is the LSD of the 1990s" and enjoined historically technophobic bohemians to "turn on, boot up, jack in." He became a promoter of virtual reality systems, and sometimes demonstrated a prototype of the Mattel Power Glove as part of his lectures (as in From Psychedelics to Cybernetics). He befriended a number of notable people in the field, such as Jaron Lanier and Brenda Laurel, a pioneer in virtual environments and human–computer interaction. During the evanescent heyday of the cyberdelic subculture, he served as a consultant to Billy Idol in the production of the 1993 album Cyberpunk.

From 1989 on, Leary began to reestablish his connection to unconventional religious movements with an interest in altered states of consciousness. In 1989, he appeared with Robert Anton Wilson in a dialog called The Inner Frontier for the Association for Consciousness Exploration, a Cleveland-based group that had been responsible for his first Cleveland appearance in 1979. After that, he appeared at the Starwood Festival, a major Neo-Pagan event run by ACE in 1992 and 1993. His planned 1994 WinterStar Symposium appearance was canceled due to his declining health. In 1992, in front of hundreds of Neo-Pagans, Leary declared, "I've always considered myself a Pagan." He also collaborated with Eric Gullichsen on Load and Run High-tech Paganism: Digital Polytheism. Shortly before his death on May 31, 1996, he recorded the album Right to Fly with Simon Stokes, which was released in July 1996.

== Death ==
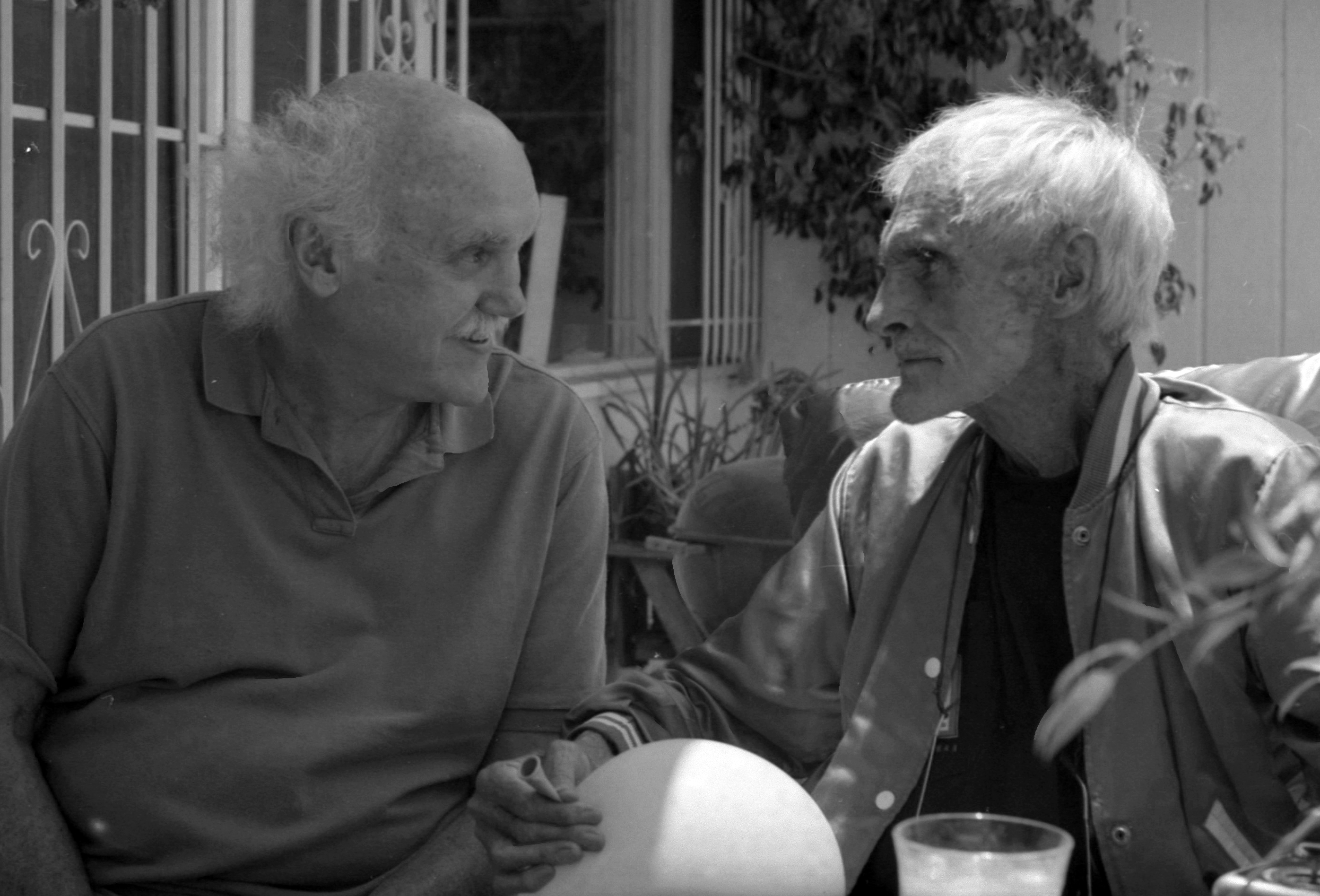
Timothy Leary (right) reuniting with Ram Dass (left) five days before his death

In January 1995, Leary was diagnosed with inoperable prostate cancer. He then notified Ram Dass and other old friends and began the process of directed dying, which he termed "designer dying". Leary did not reveal the condition to the press at that time, but did so after Jerry Garcia's death in August. Leary and Ram Dass reunited before Leary's death in May 1996, as seen in the documentary film Dying to Know: Ram Dass & Timothy Leary.

Leary's last book was Chaos & Cyber Culture, published in 1994. In it he wrote: "The time has come to talk cheerfully and joke sassily about personal responsibility for managing the dying process." His book Design for Dying, which tried to give a new perspective on death and dying, was published posthumously. Leary wrote about his belief that death is "a merging with the entire life process".

His website team, led by Chris Graves, updated his website on a daily basis as a proto-blog. The website noted his daily intake of various illicit and legal chemical substances, with a predilection for nitrous oxide, LSD and other psychedelic drugs. He was also noted for his trademark "Leary Biscuit", a cannabis edible consisting of a snack cracker with cheese and a small marijuana bud, briefly microwaved. At his request, his sterile house was redecorated by the staff with an array of surreal ornamentation. In his final months, thousands of visitors, well-wishers and old friends visited him in his California home. Until his last weeks, he gave many interviews discussing his new philosophy of embracing death.

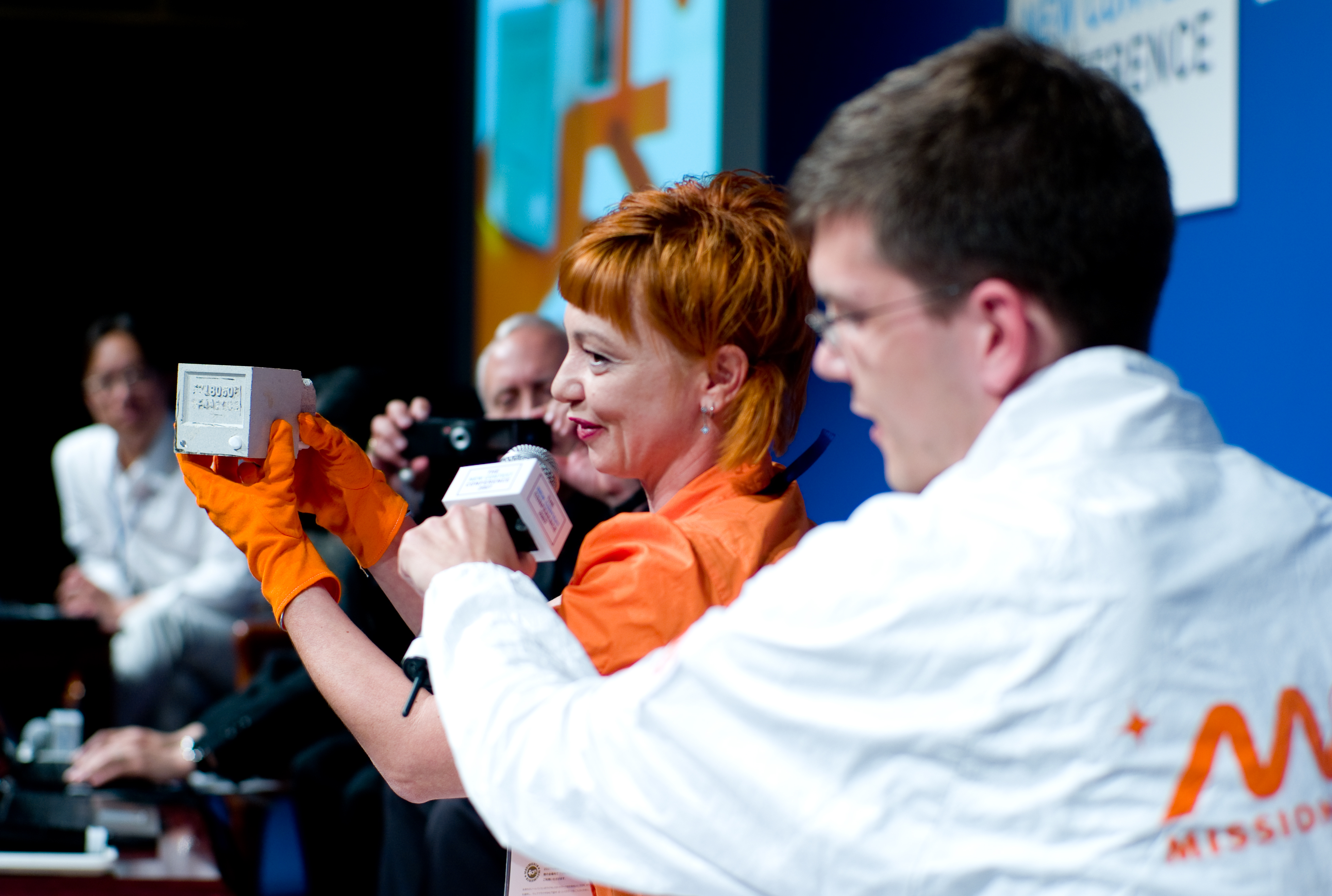
Etoy agents with mortal remains of Timothy Leary in 2007

Leary was reportedly excited for a number of years by the possibility of freezing his body in cryonic suspension, and he announced in September 1988 that he had signed up with Alcor for such treatment after having appeared at Alcor's grand opening the year before. He did not believe he would be resurrected in the future, but did believe that cryonics had important possibilities, even though he thought it had only "one chance in a thousand". He called it his "duty as a futurist", helped publicize the process and hoped that it would work for his children and grandchildren if not for him, although he said that he was "lighthearted" about it. He was connected with two cryonic organizations—first Alcor and then CryoCare—one of which delivered a cryonic tank to his house in the months before his death. Leary initially announced that he would freeze his entire body, but due to lack of funds decided to freeze his head only. Three weeks before his death, Leary changed his mind again and generally refused cryopreservation from both Alcor and CryoCare. He requested that his body be cremated, with his ashes scattered in space.

Leary died aged 75 on May 31, 1996. His death was videotaped for posterity at his request by Denis Berry and Joey Cavella, capturing his final words. Berry was the trustee of Leary's archives, and Cavella had filmed Leary during his later years. According to his son Zachary, during his final moments, he clenched his fist and said: "Why?", then, unclenching his fist, said: "Why not?". He uttered the phrase repeatedly, in different intonations, and died soon after. His last word, according to Zach, was "beautiful".

The film Timothy Leary's Dead (1996) contains a simulated sequence in which he allows his bodily functions to be suspended for the purposes of cryonic preservation. His head is removed and placed on ice. The film ends with a sequence showing the creation of the artificial head used in the film.

Seven grams (¼ oz) of Leary's ashes were arranged by his friend at Celestis to be buried in space aboard a rocket carrying the remains of 23 others, including Star Trek creator Gene Roddenberry, space colonization advocate Gerard O'Neill and German-American rocket engineer Krafft Ehricke. A Pegasus rocket containing their remains was launched on April 21, 1997, and remained in orbit for six years until it burned up in the atmosphere.

Leary's ashes were given to close friends and family. In 2015, Susan Sarandon brought some of his ashes to the Burning Man festival in Black Rock City, Nevada, and put them into an art installation there. The ashes were burned along with the installation on September 6, 2015.

== Personal life ==
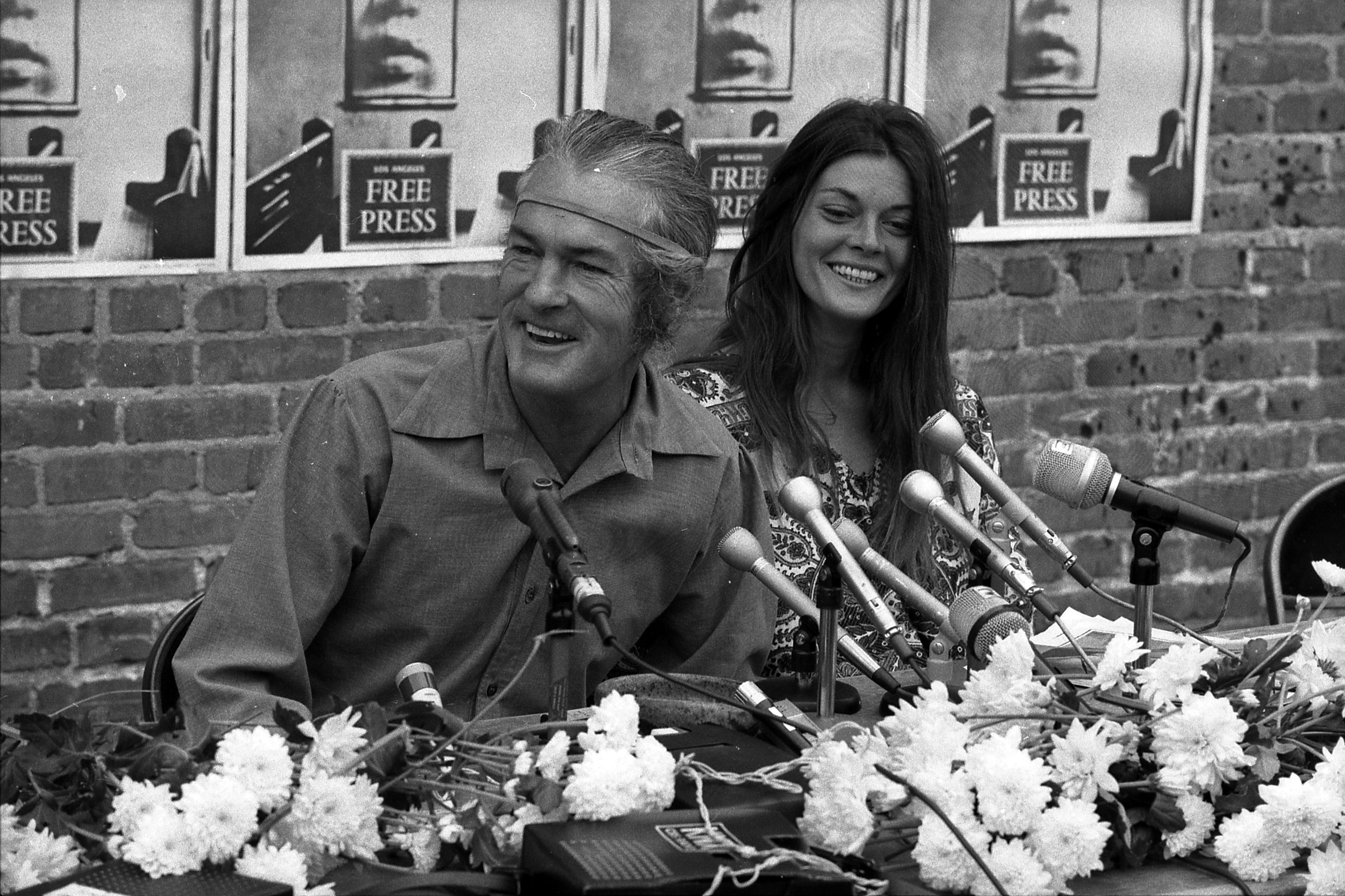
Leary and Rosemary Woodruff, 1969

Leary was legally married five times, had three biological children, and adopted a fourth. He also regarded Joanna Harcourt-Smith (his domestic partner from 1972 to 1977) as his common-law wife for the duration of their relationship. His first wife, Marianne Busch, died by suicide (as did their daughter).

- 1945–1955 Marianne Busch (1921–1955)
  - daughter Susan (1947–1990)
  - son Jack (1949–)
- 1956–1957 Mary Cioppa (1920–1996)
- 1964–1965 Nena von Schlebrügge (1941–)
- 1967–1976 (separated 1972) Rosemary Woodruff (1935–2002)
- 1972–1977 Joanna Harcourt-Smith (domestic partner) (1946–2020)
  - son Marlon Gobel (1976–)
- 1978–1992 Barbara Blum Chase (1946–)
  - son Zach (1973–) (adopted)

== Influence ==
Leary was an early influence on applying game theory to psychology, having introduced the concept to the International Association of Applied Psychology in 1961 at its annual conference in Copenhagen. (Note: Leary 1983, p. 196: "Psychiatrist Eric Berne popularised my concepts of transactional analysis and game theory in Games People Play, making accessible to the public concepts of behaviour-change that had formerly been reserved to the psychological priesthood.") He was also an early influence on transactional analysis. His concept of the four life scripts, dating to 1951, became an influence on transactional analysis by the late 1960s, popularized by Thomas Harris in his book, I'm OK, You're OK.

Many consider Leary one of the most prominent figures of the counterculture of the 1960s, and since those times he has remained influential on pop culture, literature, television, film and, especially, music.

Leary coined the influential term reality tunnel, a kind of representative realism. The theory states that, with a subconscious set of mental filters formed from their beliefs and experiences, everyone interprets the same world differently, hence "Truth is in the eye of the beholder." (Note: Higgs 2006, p. 282: "[Robert Anton] Wilson is often credited with creating the phrase 'reality tunnels', but when asked about it, he is quick to give Leary the credit.")

His ideas influenced the work of his friend Robert Anton Wilson. This influence went both ways, with Leary taking just as much from Wilson. Wilson's 1983 book Prometheus Rising was an in-depth, highly detailed and inclusive work documenting Leary's eight-circuit model of consciousness. Although the theory originated in discussions between Leary and a Hindu holy man at Millbrook, Wilson was one of its most ardent proponents and introduced it to a mainstream audience in 1977's bestselling Cosmic Trigger. In 1989, they appeared together on stage in a dialog called The Inner Frontier hosted by the Association for Consciousness Exploration, the same group that had hosted Leary's first Cleveland appearance in 1979.

World religion scholar Huston Smith was "turned on" by Leary after being introduced to him by Aldous Huxley in the early 1960s. Smith interpreted the experience as deeply religious, and described it in detailed religious terms in his book Cleansing of the Doors of Perception. Smith asked Leary whether he knew the power and danger of what he was conducting research with. In Mother Jones Magazine, 1997, Smith commented:

First, I have to say that during the three years I was involved with that Harvard study, LSD was not only legal but respectable. Before Tim went on his unfortunate careening course, it was a legitimate research project. Though I did find evidence that, when recounted, the experiences of the Harvard group and those of mystics were impossible to tell apart—descriptively indistinguishable—that's not the last word. There is still a question about the truth of the disclosure. Was the drug-induced mystical experience just an emotional jag that messed up some neural connections? Or was it a genuine disclosure, an epiphany?

== In popular culture ==
=== On screen ===
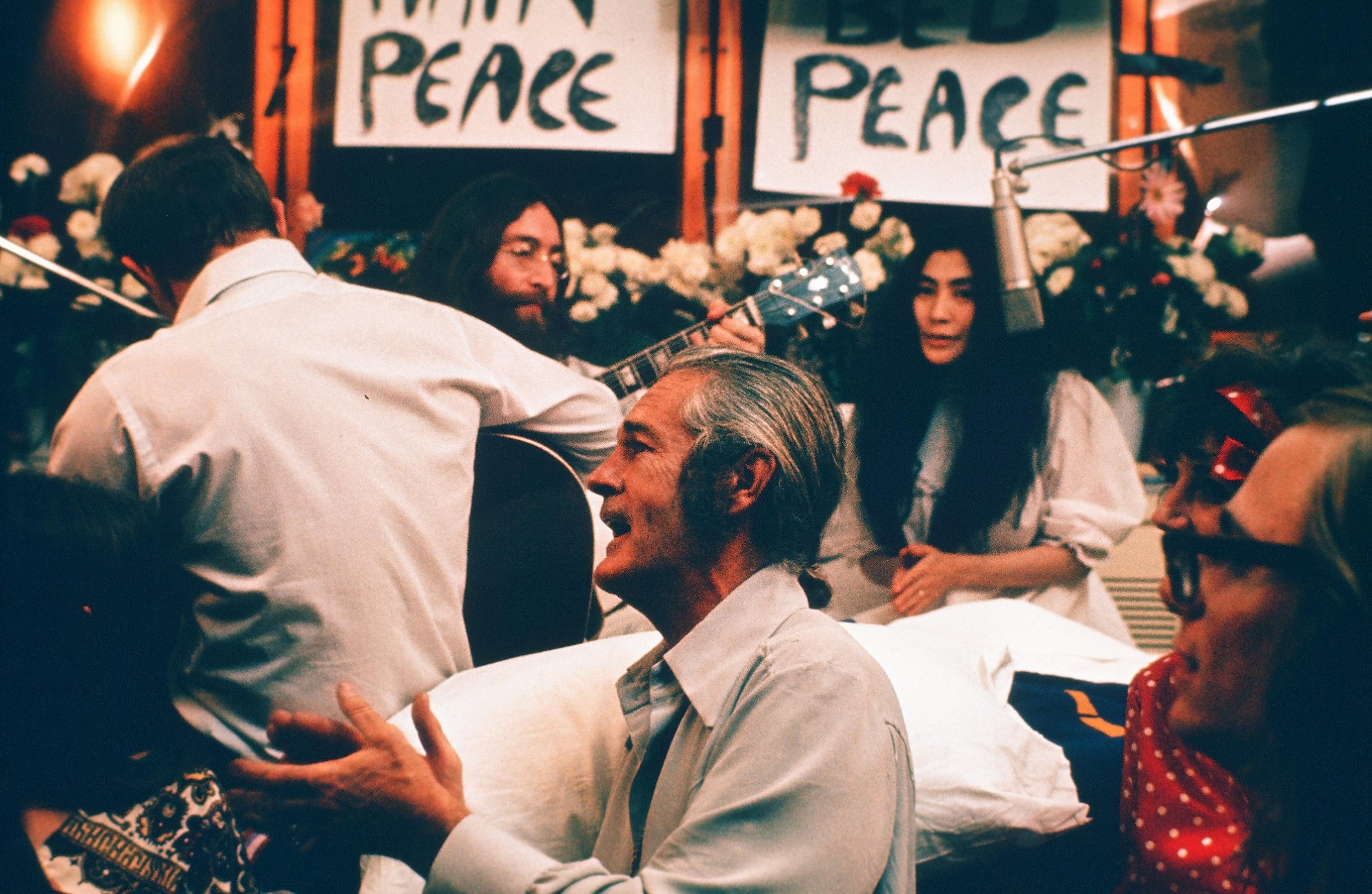
Leary, John Lennon, Yoko Ono, and others recording "Give Peace A Chance"

In the 1968 Dragnet episode "The Big Prophet", Liam Sullivan played Brother William Bentley, leader of the Temple of the Expanded Mind, a thinly fictionalized Leary. Bentley held forth for the entire half-hour on the rights of the individual and the benefits of LSD and marijuana, while Joe Friday argued the contrary.

The 1979 musical Hair and the 1967 stage performance it is based on make multiple references to Leary.

Leary appears in Cheech & Chong's 1981 film Nice Dreams, featured in a scene in which he gives Cheech "the key to the universe".

In 1994, Leary appeared as himself in the Space Ghost Coast to Coast episode "Elevator", and also appeared in an episode of The Adventures of Brisco County, Jr. as the character Dr. Milo.

In 1996, months before his death, Leary appeared in the feminist science fiction feature film Conceiving Ada.

The 1998 movie Fear and Loathing in Las Vegas, adapted from Hunter S. Thompson's 1971 novel, portrays heavy psychedelic drug use and mentions Leary when the protagonist ponders the meaning of the acid wave of the 1960s.

A 2017 episode of Urban Myths depicts a meeting between Leary and Cary Grant, whom he introduces to LSD.

=== In music ===
The Psychedelic Experience (1964) was the inspiration for John Lennon's song "Tomorrow Never Knows", on The Beatles' album Revolver (1966).

Galt MacDermot's song "The Flesh Failures", from the 1967 musical Hair, includes the line "Answer for Timothy Leary, dearie."

The Moody Blues recorded two songs about Leary. "Legend of a Mind", written and sung by Ray Thomas on their 1968 album In Search of the Lost Chord, begins: "Timothy Leary's dead. No, no, no, no, he's outside looking in". The second is "When You're a Free Man" on the 1972 album Seventh Sojourn.

Leary recruited Lennon to write a theme song for his California gubernatorial campaign against Ronald Reagan (which was interrupted by Leary's prison sentence for cannabis possession), inspiring Lennon to come up with "Come Together" (1969), based on Leary's campaign theme and catchphrase.

Leary was present and sang back-up vocals when Lennon and his wife, Yoko Ono, recorded "Give Peace a Chance" (1969) during their bed-in in Montreal and is mentioned in the lyrics of the song.

The Who's 1970 single "The Seeker" mentions Leary in a sequence where the song's protagonist claims that Leary (among other high-profile people) was unable to help them with their search for answers.

While in exile in Switzerland, Leary and British writer Brian Barritt collaborated with the German band Ash Ra Tempel and recorded the album Seven Up (1973). He is credited as a songwriter, and his lyrics and vocals can be heard throughout the album. Of the work of his friend H. R. Giger, a surrealist artist from Switzerland who won an Academy Award for his work on the film Alien, Leary said:

Giger's work disturbs us, spooks us, because of its enormous evolutionary time span. It shows us, all too clearly, where we come from and where we are going.

— Timothy Leary, The New York Times

During the height of rave culture from the 1980s to mid-2000s, recordings of Leary and other psychedelic thinkers speaking were often mixed into electronic music. The Shamen honored him in the song "Ebenezer Goode" on their album Boss Drum.

In 1995, Leary had a cameo at the end of the video for alternative rock group Blind Melon's song "Galaxie".

The Marcy Playground song "It's Saturday", from its 1999 album Shapeshifter, mentions joining Leary "in a cryogenic freeze".

=== In comic books ===
In 1973, El Perfecto Comics was organized by Aline Kominsky and published by The Print Mint to raise funds for the Timothy Leary Defense Fund. The comic features 31 underground artists contributing mostly one-pagers about drug experiences (primarily LSD). The front cover and a contributed one-page story are by Robert Crumb.

In 1979, Last Gasp published the one-shot edition Neurocomics: Timothy Leary. "Evolved from transmissions of Dr. Timothy Leary as filtered through Pete Von Sholly & George DiCaprio", it is based on Leary's writings related to life, the brain, and intelligence. DiCaprio collaborated with Leary on the script.

== Works ==
Leary authored or coauthored more than 20 books and was featured on more than a dozen audio recordings. His acting career included over a dozen appearances in movies and television shows in various roles and over 30 appearances as himself. He also produced and/or collaborated with others in the creation of multimedia presentations and computer games.

In 2011, The New York Times reported that the New York Public Library had acquired Leary's personal archives, including papers, videotapes, photographs and other archival material from the Leary estate, including correspondence and documents relating to Allen Ginsberg, Aldous Huxley, William Burroughs, Jack Kerouac, Ken Kesey, Arthur Koestler, G. Gordon Liddy, and other prominent cultural figures. The collection became available in 2013.

== See also ==
- Grateful Dead
- John C. Lilly
- David Peel
- My Psychedelic Love Story
- The Sekhmet Hypothesis
- Zihuatanejo Project
