= The Center of the Cyclone =

1972 non-fiction book by John C. Lilly

The Center of the Cyclone: An Autobiography of Inner Space
- First edition
- Author: John C.Lilly
- Publisher: Julian Press
- Publication date: United States; 1972
- ISBN: 0553078143
- Preceded by: Programming and Metaprogramming in the Human Biocomputer

The Center of the Cyclone: An Autobiography of Inner Space is a 1972 book by John C. Lilly published by the Julian Press.

== Content ==
The book explores the question of consciousness and the inner world of the mind, refracted through the experience of Lilly himself in the 1960s using the drug LSD and, particularly, flotation tanks and isolation. It also examines Lilly's notion of self-metaprogramming as a means to shape and direct certain experiences and gain autonomy and mastery over the direction that they take.

The book also recounted Lilly's interactions with other explorers of consciousness such as Oscar Ichazo in Chile whose work was based in part on that of Gurdijeff. Lilly adapted Ichazo's concepts of a range of different levels of experience, using pre-existing concepts such as satori or samadhi, to create a composite framework of consciousness ranging on the one hand from the death of the ego and fusion with the Universal Mind to a state of the 'quintessence of evil' and 'deepest hell imaginable' on the other hand.

One of the key insights put forward by Lilly is the view that "in the province of the mind, what is believed to be true is true or becomes true, within certain limits to be found experientially and experimentally. These limits are further beliefs to be transcended. In the province of the mind, there are no limits." In this context, Lilly draws a distinction between the limitless province of the mind and the realm of the body, in which there are limits that cannot be transcended.
