= My Psychedelic Love Story =

- Directed by: Errol Morris
- Written by: Joanna Harcourt-Smith
- Produced by: Errol Morris, others
- Starring: Joanna Harcourt-Smith, Timothy Leary
- Production companies: Fourth Floor Productions, Moxie Pictures
- Distributed by: Showtime Documentary Films
- Release date: 2020
- Running time: 102 minutes
- Country: United States
- Language: English

My Psychedelic Love Story is a 2020 documentary film about the French socialite Joanna Harcourt-Smith and her relationship with Timothy Leary during the 1970s. It was directed by filmmaker Errol Morris. The film was based on Harcourt-Smith's 2013 memoir Tripping the Bardo with Timothy Leary: My Psychedelic Love Story. It was released on Showtime on November 29, 2020. My Psychedelic Love Story has been reviewed by various authors. There are also interviews with Morris about the film.

== See also ==
- Errol Morris § Filmography
- List of psychedelic documentaries
