= Dolphin Island (novel) =

1963 novel by Arthur C. Clarke

- First edition (UK)
- Author: Arthur C. Clarke
- Language: English
- Genre: Science fiction
- Publisher: Gollancz (UK); Holt, Rinehart and Winston (US)
- Publication date: 1963
- Publication place: United Kingdom
- Media type: Print (Hardback & Paperback)
- Pages: 186

Dolphin Island: A Story of the People of the Sea is a novel by Arthur C. Clarke first published in 1963.

== Plot summary ==
Late one night (in the world of the future), a giant cargo hovership makes an emergency landing somewhere in the middle of the United States and an enterprising teenager named Johnny Clinton stows away on it. A few hours later, the craft crashes into the Pacific Ocean. The crew ("even the ship's cat") is offloaded onto lifeboats, leaving Johnny (who, as a stowaway, was not on the ship's manifest) adrift in the flotsam from the wreckage. His life is saved by the "People of the Sea"—dolphins. A school of these fantastic creatures guides him to an island on Australia's Great Barrier Reef. Johnny becomes involved with the work of a strange and fascinating research community where a brilliant professor tries to communicate with dolphins. Johnny learns skindiving and survives a typhoon—only to risk his life again, immediately afterwards, to get medical help for the people on the island.

== See also ==
- John C. Lilly, dolphin communication and psychedelics researcher
- List of underwater science fiction works
