= Theodora Children's Charity =

British children's charity

Theodora Children's Charity is a British charity which helps sick and disabled children across the UK. It was founded in 1994 and the charity focuses on improving the lives of children in hospitals and hospices through music and entertainment.

== Activities ==
The hospitals involved in the programme receive weekly visits from "Giggle Doctors". The Giggle Doctors use their skills to involve each patient as much as possible, ensuring that the child is not only a spectator but can participate in the magic and the activities.

== Awards ==
- Guardian Charity Awards 2003
