= W. Patrick McCray =

American historian

W. Patrick McCray (born 1967) is a professor of history at the University of California, Santa Barbara. His subjects include the history of science and the history of technology.

== Life ==
McCray received a PhD from the University of Arizona in 1996. He is the author or editor of several books on the history of science and technology.

== Works ==
External audio
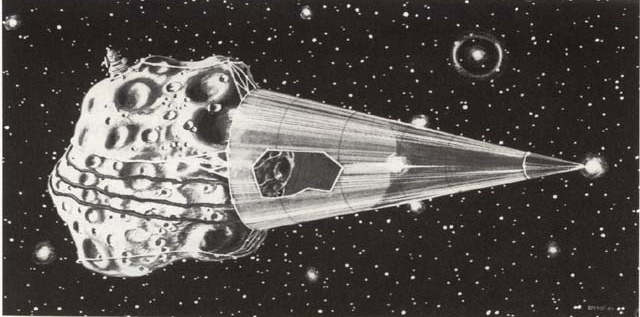
- “Episode 206: Is Space the Place? Trying to Save Humanity by Mining Asteroids”, Science History Institute

- Glassmaking in Renaissance Venice, 1999, Ashgate.
- Giant Telescopes: Astronomical Ambitions and the Promise of Technology, 2004, Harvard University Press.
- Keep Watching the Skies: The Story of Operation Moonwatch and the Dawn of the Space Age, 2008, Princeton University Press.
- The Visioneers. How a Group of Elite Scientists Pursued Space Colonies, Nanotechnologies, and a Limitless Future. 2012, Princeton University Press, ISBN 978-0-691-13983-8.
- Groovy Science: Knowledge, Innovation, and American Counterculture, co-edited with David Kaiser, 2016, University of Chicago Press, ISBN 9780226372914
- Making Art Work: How Cold War Engineers and Artists Forged a New Creative Culture, 2020, MIT Press.
- Greedy Science: Creating Knowledge, Making Money and Being Famous in the 1980s, co-edited with Michael D. Gordin, 2025, Johns Hopkins University Press
