= Árpád Plesch =

Hungarian businessperson (1889–1974)

- Born: Árpád Plesch; 25 March 1889; Budapest, Austro-Hungarian Empire (now Hungary)
- Died: 16 December 1975 (aged 86); London, United Kingdom
- Occupations: Financier, banker and lawyer
- Known for: Being an advisor to Gianni Agnelli
- Spouses: Léonie Caro Ulam (m. 1935) Etti von Wurmbrand-Stuppach (m. 1954): Marysia Ulam Krauss Harcourt-Smith (before 1974)

Árpád Plesch (25 March 1889 – 16 December 1975) was a Hungarian financier, banker, and lawyer. He was primarily known as key advisor to Fiat and Gianni Agnelli of the Agnelli family. Plesch made his great fortune during World War II through less fortunate Jews who sent their money to him for safekeeping in Switzerland.

== Early life and education ==
Plesch was born 25 March 1889 in Budapest, Austro-Hungarian Empire (presently Hungary), the fourth of seven children, to Lájos Henrik Plesch (1852–1908), a merchant, and Honora Plesch (née Seligmann; 1848–1917) into a Jewish family. He had three older and two younger siblings. His older brother was János Plesch.

== Collection ==
He owned a celebrated collection of rare botanical books and esoteric pornography. His botanical collection has been included in Douglas Cooper's Great Private Collections.

== Personal life ==
Plesch firstly married Léonie Caro Ulam (1883–1951), secondly to her daughter Marysia Ulam Krauss Harcourt–Smith (1912–1976), through which he was affiliated with being the step-grandfather of French financier Arpad Busson, which was named after him. Léonie Ulam was the aunt of the mathematician Stanislaw Ulam. In his memoir, Adventures of a mathematician, Ulam wrote:

My uncle Michael's wife happened to live in Paris at the time and she kindly offered to receive me and to send to my modest hotel her chauffered limousine to take me sightseeing. I was so embarrassed at the thought of being seen arriving in a Rolls-Royce or a Duesenberg at the Louvre or some other museum, it felt so incongruous, that I declined her offer.

In 1954, Plesch married Etti Countess von Wurmbrand–Stuppach, colloquially known as Etti (1914–2003), an Austrian socialite, daughter of Count Ferdinand von Wurmbrand–Stuppach (1879–1933) and his wife May Baltazzi (1885–1981), a cousin of Baroness Mary Vetsera and mistress of Crown Prince Rudolf of Austria. She inherited the great fortune of Plesch.

Despite being married three times, Plesch did not have children.

== Publications ==
- Botanique, 1954
- Essais d'acclimatation de plantes tropicales en France, 1962
- Mille et un livres botaniques de la collection Arpad Plesch, 1973
