= János Plesch =

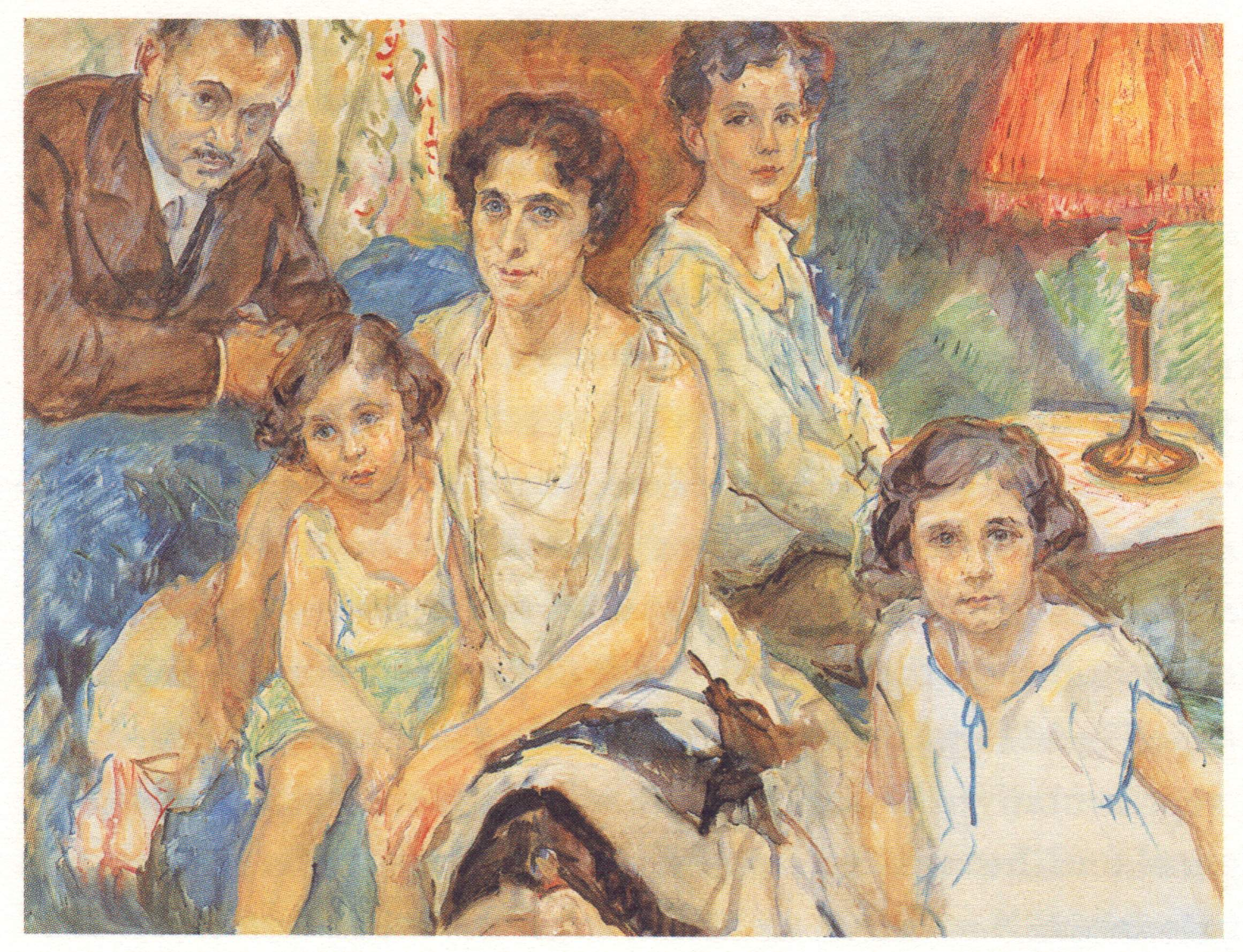
János Plesch (left) and his family, by Max Slevogt

János Oscar Plesch (18 November 1878 – 28 May 1957) was a Hungarian academic pathologist, physiologist, and physician.

Plesch was well known internationally for his clinical research on blood circulation. He also invented the first convenient device for taking blood pressure.

Plesch was a close friend and doctor to Albert Einstein for 25 years. Plesch's autobiography contains two chapters on Einstein.

Plesch lived in Berlin for much of his early working life. As a Jew, he left Germany after the Nazi Party took control and moved to England where he was required to re-qualify as a medical doctor. In the UK, Plesch became the physician to the economist John Maynard Keynes and was credited with helping Keynes to survive heart attacks and declining health through his skilled medical treatment.

Plesch's son, Peter, was an art collector, and a professor of Chemistry.
