= Bomb Factory discography =

Japanese musical band during the 90s

- Studio albums: 5
- Compilation albums: 3
- Singles: 5
- Video albums: 1
- Music videos: 5
- Mini albums: 5
- Split singles: 1
- Other appearances: 15

Bomb Factory is a Japanese band with styles that originated in heavy metal and punk rock music during the early 1990s and later developed into the hardcore punk and melodic hardcore sound found on most studio releases. The band was formed in 1991 and remains active to this day. Since the formation, Bomb Factory has released a substantial amount of material and has become widely known throughout Japan. In the United States and Europe, Bomb Factory gained initial popularity with the inclusion of the theme track "Exciter" on Tecmo's Dead or Alive 2 video game. The 2008 release of the Moshing Through Tokyo compilation album further promoted the band's material outside Japan. The most recent release of Closed upholds the same musical styles characteristic of the band.

== Albums ==
=== Studio albums ===
Year	Album details
1996	Blade of a Knife: Released: August 15, 1996 (Japan); Label: Monstar Records (MONSTAR-001); Format: CD
2002	Go This Way: Released: January 30, 2002 (Japan); Label: Monstar Records/Hell Hornet Records (LTDC-031); Format: CD
2004	Another Day, Another Life: Released: November 3, 2004 (Japan); Label: Monstar Records/Limited Records (LTDC-070); Format: CD
2006	Social Suicide: Released: November 15, 2006 (Japan); Label: Sea Green/Toshiba EMI (QIET-11102); Format: CD
2010	Closed: Released: December 1, 2010 (Japan); Label: Monstar Records (MSRDD-002); Format: CD

=== Mini-albums ===
Year	Album details
1994	Explode a Bombshell: Released: December 1994 (Japan); Label: MINdo Company (MCR-001); Format: CD
1999	Bomb Factory: Released: September 1, 1999 (Japan); Label: Monstar Records/Hell Hornet Records (LTDC-007); Format: CD
2002	Fat Boost: Released: December 4, 2002 (Japan); Label: Monstar Records/Hell Hornet Records (LTDC-044); Format: CD
2013	Rage and Hope: Released: December 18, 2013 (Japan); Label: Caffeine Bomb Records (CBR-61); Format: CD
2015	Hostility: Released: October 7, 2015 (Japan); Label: Caffeine Bomb Records (CBR-70); Format: CD

=== Compilation albums ===
Year	Album details
2004	Discord: Released: September 30, 2004 (Europe); Label: MHP (Mesures d' Hygiene Production)/Skalopards Prod'z; Format: CD
2007	Greatest Hits: Released: November 28, 2007 (Japan); August 19, 2008 as Moshing Through Tokyo (Europe, United States); Label: Monstar Records/CCRE (Japan MOCC-0001); N2O Entertainment (Europe, United States N2O-CD-132); Format: CD
2016	Covered: Released: August 24, 2016 (Japan); Label: Caffeine Bomb Records (CBR-78); Format: CD
2022	Acoustic Collection: Released: July 20, 2022 (Japan); Label: Caffeine Bomb Records (CBR-120); Format: CD

=== Maxi singles ===
Year	Album details
1999	How Do You Feel?: Released: September 16, 1999 (Japan); Label: Monstar Records/Hell Hornet Records (LTDA-001); Format: LP
2000	Break Up: Released: September 1, 2000 (Japan); Label: Monstar Records/Hell Hornet Records (LTDC-014); Format: CD
2003	Discord: Released: August 20, 2003 (Japan); Label: Monstar Records (LTDC-054); Format: CD
2004	Pilot Wire: Released: September 1, 2004 (Japan); Label: Monstar Records (LTDC-069); Format: CD
2006	Slickdrive: Released: July 19, 2006 (Japan); Label: Sea Green/Toshiba EMI (QIET-11101); Format: CD

=== Split singles ===
Year	Album details
1997	Monstar Cup Stage 1: Released: June 1, 1997 (Japan); Label: Monstar Records (MONSTAR-002); Format: CD

=== Other appearances ===
Year	Song	Album
1998	"How Do You Feel?", "Speeder", "She", "Crow"	Tokyo Fist: Hardcore Moshing Crew
2000	"Exciter", "Deadly Silence Beach"	Dead or Alive 2: Original Sound Trax
2001	"Clumsy Bird"	Style of Limited
2001	"Clumsy Bird"	Stylus #2
2002	"Holiday"	Style of Limited 2
2003	"Worst-Case"	Style of Limited #03
2003	"Exciter"	Best of Hasunuma: 1999-2003
2004	"Time"	Style of Limited '04
2004	"Counter Plot"	Cross the Street: Japanese Punk and New Wave Tribute
2005	"In the Sun"	White Out, Vol. 1: Real Snowboarder's Compilation
2005	"Break Up"	Suiken: Japanese Punk & Hardcore Compilation
2005	"When the Wind Blows"	Style of Limited: Vitalize
2006	"Slickdrive"	White Out, Vol. 3: Real Snowboarder's Compilation
2007	"Way"	White Out, Vol. 4: Real Snowboarder's Compilation
2008	"Exciter", "Discord", "All the Way"	Land of the Rising Sound, Vol. 1

== Videos ==
=== Video albums ===
Year	Video details
2006	Fifteenth: After All These Years: Released: November 15, 2006 (Japan); Label: Sea Green/Monstar Records/Limited Records (LTDB-002); Format: DVD
2018	25 Years: One Man Gig: Released: August 25, 2018 (Japan); Label: Caffeine Bomb Records (CBR-90); Format: DVD

=== Music videos ===
Year	Title	Director(s)
2006	"Viper"	?
