= Greatest Hits (Bomb Factory album) =

Greatest hits album by Bomb Factory
- Released: November 28, 2007 (Japan); August 18, 2008 (U.S.)
- Recorded: 1999–2007
- Genre: Hard rock Punk rock Hardcore punk
- Length: 49:53
- Label: Monstar/CCRE

Bomb Factory chronology
Social Suicide (2006)	Greatest Hits (2007)	Closed (2010)

Cover from Moshing Through Tokyo

Greatest Hits is the first compilation album by punk rock band Bomb Factory. It was released in November 2007 on Monstar Records/CCRE, and contains 16 songs. The album artwork was produced by New York–based illustrator Joe Simko. A year later, Bomb Factory signed with American N2O Records and re-released the album under the title Moshing Through Tokyo on August 18, 2008, making it their first release in the United States and the second in Europe after Discord. It was also their first release on iTunes. The same tracks and cover art were included from Greatest Hits with only minor changes to the design.

== Track listing ==
All tracks are written by Bomb Factory

No.	Title	Length
1.	"Exciter" (from Bomb Factory)	3:31
2.	"Awaited Time" (from Fat Boost)	4:00
3.	"Down" (from Go This Way)	2:49
4.	"Viper" (from Social Suicide)	3:09
5.	"Fly" (previously unreleased)	3:26
6.	"Discord" (from Discord)	2:59
7.	"Pilot Wire" (from Pilot Wire)	2:48
8.	"Worst-Case" (from Fat Boost)	3:08
9.	"Slickdrive" (from Slickdrive)	3:37
10.	"Free Chain" (from How Do You Feel?)	3:44
11.	"All the Way" (from Another Day, Another Life)	2:33
12.	"Remember" (from Go This Way)	3:21
13.	"Days" (from Slickdrive)	3:24
14.	"So Long" (from Social Suicide)	3:59
15.	"Time" (from Another Day, Another Life)	3:18
16.	"Break Up" (from Break Up)	3:06
