= List of Discordian works =

Discordian works include a number of books, not all of which actually exist. Among those that have been published are Principia Discordia, first published in 1965 (which includes portions of The Honest Book of Truth); and The Illuminatus! Trilogy, which had its first volume published in 1975.

== Early Discordian works ==
Works by members of the original Discordian Society.

=== Principia Discordia ===
Principia Discordia is a Discordian religious text written by Greg Hill (Malaclypse the Younger) and Kerry Thornley (Omar Khayyam Ravenhurst). It was originally published under the title Principia Discordia or How the West was Lost in a limited edition of five copies in 1965.

=== The Illuminatus! Trilogy ===
One of the most influential of all Discordian works, The Illuminatus! Trilogy is a series of three novels written by Robert Shea and Robert Anton Wilson purportedly between 1969 and 1971, and first published in 1975. The trilogy is a satirical, postmodern, science fiction-influenced adventure story; a drug-, sex- and magic-laden trek through a number of conspiracy theories, both historical and imaginary, which hinge on the authors' version of the Illuminati. The narrative often switches between third and first person perspectives and jumps around in time. It is thematically dense, covering topics like counterculture, numerology and Discordianism.

In a 1980 interview given to the science fiction magazine Starship, Wilson suggested the novel was an attempt to build a myth around Discordianism:

We felt the [Discordian] Society needed some opposition, because the whole idea of it is based on conflict and dialectics. So, we created an opposition within the Discordian Society, which we called the Bavarian Illuminati [...] So, we built up this myth about the warfare between the Discordian Society and the Illuminati for quite a while, until one day Bob Shea said to me, "You know, we could write a novel about this!"

=== Zen Without Zen Masters ===
Zen Without Zen Masters is a book by Camden Benares (The Count of Five), published in 1977, of koans, stories and exercises of a Discordian nature. It includes tales of several early Discordians including Hill (as Mal) and Thornley (as Omar and Ho Chi Zen). "Enlightenment of a Seeker" from this book is also present in Principia Discordia as "A Zen Story". There are references to this story in The Illuminatus! Trilogy, as well.

=== Zenarchy ===
Zenarchy was first self-published by Thornley, under the pen name Ho Chi Zen, as a series of one-page (or broadsheet) newsletters in the 1960s,. A selection of the material was later reedited and expanded by Thornley and republished in paperback by IllumiNet Press in 1991. The book describes Thornley's concept of Zenarchy "a way of Zen applied to social life. A non-combative, non-participatory, no-politics approach to anarchy intended to get the serious student thinking."

=== Summa Universalia ===
Summa Universalia was another work by Malaclypse the Younger, purported to be a summary of the Universe. It was excerpted in the first edition of Principia Discordia but never published. It was mentioned in an introduction to one of the Principia editions, and the work was quoted from in the first edition.

The longest known fragment of the text is the Myth of Ichabod (alluded to as the "Myth of Starbuck" in the 4th edition of the Principia) which was circulated independently.

=== The Honest Book of Truth ===
In addition to Summa Universalia, Principia Discordia also included selections from Kerry Wendell Thornley's writings, which he named The Honest Book of Truth. These sections are clearly marked, and are subtitled in parody of the bible's books.

The Honest Book of Truth was for a long time not available to the general public, but a copy of it was published in Historia Discordia.

Selections from this work can also be found within The Illuminatus! Trilogy.

=== Natural Law, or Don't Put a Rubber on Your Willy and Other Writings from a Natural Outlaw ===
Natural Law, or Don't Put a Rubber on Your Willy, by Robert Anton Wilson, originally appeared in 1985 as an essay in New Libertarian. It was subsequently released as a standalone pamphlet in 1987. A small paperback containing the essay and other works was also published in 1987 by Loompanics. In 2022, Natural Law, or Don't Put a Rubber on Your Willy and Other Writings from a Natural Outlaw was released. The collection features the original Natural Law article, but also includes an additional 12 Wilson writings: essays, interviews and a short story, all expounding upon the themes in Natural Law.

== Later Discordian works ==
=== Apocrypha Discordia ===
Apocrypha Discordia was compiled by Rev. DrJon Swabey, later known as His Holiness The Rev. DrJon, and published in 2001. Steve Jackson and Reverend Loveshade had previously considered publishing a book by the name suggested by Russel Dalenberg on the usenet group rec.games.board. The book contains material by both original and later Discordians and is illustrated by Pope Phil Wlodarczyk III. It was translated into German as Apocrypha Diskordia and because of it DrJon with Adam Gorightly were chosen to write an "outroduction" to a hardback edition of Principia Discordia.

=== The Black Iron Prison ===
The Black Iron Prison was an effort to create an updated, modern book that would function as Principia Discordia did when released. The collaborators stated that "while the original Principia Discordia holds important messages and philosophies, we wondered if some of the humor and language might be dated and lost on a younger generation of Discordians. We wanted to crystallize some of our favorite themes from the Principia, those of radical free will and self-emancipation." The goal was to encourage "critical thinking and self awareness" in the reader. The Black Iron Prison has influenced Discordian communities in various parts of the world.

=== Historia Discordia ===
Historia Discordia was compiled by Adam Gorightly with foreword by Robert Anton Wilson. It is a compilation of early Discordian photos, tracts, art collages, and more including works by Discordianism founders Greg Hill (Malaclypse the Younger) and Kerry Thornley (Omar Khayyam Ravenhurst). Among other things, it contains the long-missing The Honest Book of Truth and the first edition of Principia Discordia. It features a blurb by comic book writer Alan Moore.

=== Principia Entropius ===
Principia Entropius is a gathering of material from early Discordian message boards of the 1990s. Brenton Clutterbuck described the book as "a terrible mess that makes one’s head hurt", but also as "a rare and valuable (historically if not creatively) snapshot of Discordianism in the 90s".

== Works about Discordianism ==
=== The Prankster and the Conspiracy ===
The Prankster and the Conspiracy: The Story of Kerry Thornley and How He Met Oswald and Inspired the Counterculture focuses on Kerry Thornley AKA Omar Khayyam Ravenhurst, co-founder of Discordianism. It was written by Adam Gorightly, self-proclaimed "crackpot historian."

=== Chasing Eris ===
Chasing Eris by Brenton Clutterbuck is a snapshot of the state of international Discordianism sixty years after its foundation, documenting "a cross-section of international Discordianism" and exploring its influences on counterculture, nerd culture, the copyleft movement, pop music and other art forms as well as connections to the assassination of John F. Kennedy, Charles Manson and the German secret service. The book includes several interviews and reports from the author's travels in North and South America, Australia, and Europe to meet Discordian individuals as well as whole groups. It also includes an interpretation of the Principia Discordia chapter "The Parable of The Bitter Tea" by its original author. It has gained the attention of websites such as RAWillumination.
