= Discordia (disambiguation) =

Discordia is the Roman personification of strife and discord

Discordia may also refer to:

== Music ==
- Discordia (album), a 2006 studio album by Misery Index
- Discordia (band), an Australia industrial music band
- "Discordia" (song), a 2014 single by Todd La Torre and Glen Drover
- All Hail Discordia, a 1997 studio album by By Divine Right

== Other uses ==
- Discordianism, a modern religion centered on the idea that chaos is as important as order
  - Apocrypha Discordia, a collection of various works on Discordianism, compiled by Rev. Dr Jon Swabey
  - Discordian works, a collection of religious texts that include Principia Discordia and The Illuminatus Trilogy
  - Principia Discordia, a religious text written by Greg Hill and Kerry Thornley
- Discordia (moth), a genus of moths
- Discordia (film), a 2004 documentary film
- Discordia (game), a 2009 online game set in The Dark Tower universe
- Illa de la Discòrdia (a.k.a. "Discordia block"), a district of Barcelona, Spain

== See also ==
- Discord (disambiguation)
