= Bomb Factory =

A bomb factory is a factory for building bombs.

Bomb Factory may also refer to:

- Bomb Factory Studio, Los Angeles, California, US; a recording studio
- The Factory in Deep Ellum (a.k.a. "The Bomb Factory"), Dallas, Texas, US; a live music venue
- The Bomb Factory Art Foundation, London, England, UK; an arts foundation
- Bomb Factory (band), a Japanese punk rock band
  - Bomb Factory (album), a 1999 album by the eponymous Japanese band

== See also ==
- Arsenals, including factories of bombs
- Strategic bombing of factories
- Factory (disambiguation)
- Bomb (disambiguation)
