= Fnord =

Neologism coined in 1965

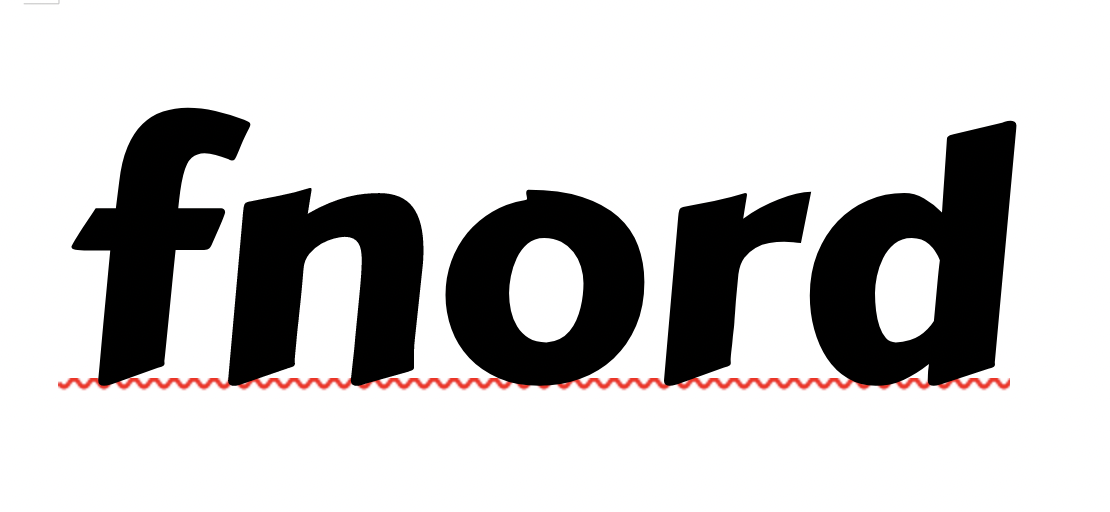
The word fnord

Fnord (/fnɔːrd/) is a word coined in 1965 by Kerry Thornley and Greg Hill in the Discordian religious text Principia Discordia. It entered into popular culture after appearing in The Illuminatus! Trilogy (1975) of novels written by Robert Shea and Robert Anton Wilson. Here, the interjection fnord is given hypnotic power over the unenlightened, and children in grade school are taught to be unable to see the word consciously. For the rest of their lives, every appearance of the word subconsciously generates a feeling of unease and confusion which prevents rational consideration of the text in which it appears.

== Origins ==
The word was coined as a nonsensical term with religious undertones in the Discordian parody of religious texts Principia Discordia (1965), by Kerry Thornley and Greg Hill, but was popularized by The Illuminatus! Trilogy (1975) of satirical conspiracy fiction novels, by Robert Shea and Robert Anton Wilson. Illuminatus! was produced, in the United Kingdom, as a cycle of plays by anarchic theatre director Ken Campbell and his Jungian Science Fiction Theatre of Liverpool. The plays further popularized the term.

In the novel trilogy (and the plays), the interjection "fnord" is given hypnotic power over the unenlightened. Under the Illuminati program, children in grade school are taught to be unable to consciously see the word "fnord". For the rest of their lives, every appearance of the word subconsciously generates a feeling of unease and confusion, preventing rational consideration of the text it appears in. The uneasiness and confusion create a perpetual low-level state of fear in the populace. The government acts on the premise that a fearful populace keeps them in power.

In the Shea/Wilson construct, fnords—occurrences of the word "fnord"—are scattered liberally in the text of newspapers and magazines, causing fear and anxiety in those following current events. However, there are no fnords in the advertisements, encouraging a consumerist society. The exclusion of the text from rational consciousness also enables the Illuminati to publish messages to each other in newspapers, etc., without fear that other people will be aware of them. It is implied in the books that fnord is not the actual word used for this task, but merely a substitute, since most readers would be unable to see the actual word.

To "see the fnords" means to be unaffected by the supposed hypnotic power of the word or, more loosely, of other fighting words. The term may also be used to refer to the experience of becoming aware of a phenomenon's ubiquity after first observing it. The phrase "I have seen the fnords" was graffitied on a British railway bridge throughout the 1980s and 1990s, until the bridge was upgraded. The bridge, located between Earlsdon and Coventry city centre, is known locally as "Anarchy Bridge". The bridge and the phrase were mentioned in the novel A Touch of Love by Jonathan Coe.

== Usage ==
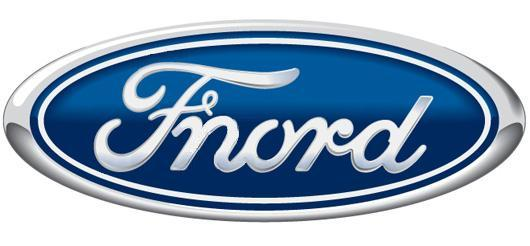
A parody of the Ford Motor Company logo

The lack of a clear definition of the word, and its popularity among certain groups on the internet, allowed it to be appropriated as a placeholder word (a metasyntactic variable) in computer programming, particularly by those with ties to Discordianism or the Church of the SubGenius. It has also been found useful as the name for a "techno cultural" conference, computer programs, and as a general placeholder word in computing literature.

Fnord! is the name of a (now defunct) freeware NT web server created by Brian Morin in 1995 and transferred to the care of Stephen Kazmierczak in 1997 when Morin was initiated into the summer Internet Server group at Microsoft. In his final transmission, Morin cites concern for potential legal backlash from the established tech giant as the reason for abandoning development of the free Fnord! server solution. Microsoft released Windows 95 and the accompanying Microsoft Network in the same time frame, which was seen as a play by the tech giant to monopolize the emerging online experience of dial-up users by introducing a toll road style business plan for accessing the world's information.

Paulo Goode, a typeface designer from West Cork, Ireland, created a serif font named Fnord in 2016 which contains 23 fonts in five weights. The geometry of the upper case 'O' is drawn on an axis of 23 degrees while the lower case 'o' falls on a 17-degree axis. The 23 / 17 numerology is reflective of similar numerical themes from The Illuminatus! Trilogy.

== Other uses ==
The word has been used in newsgroup and hacker culture to indicate irony, humor, or Surrealism. Placement at the end of a statement in brackets (fnord) explicitly tags the intent, and may be so applied to any random or surreal sentence, coercive subtext, or anything jarringly out of context, intentional or not. It is sometimes used as a metasyntactic variable in programming. Fnord appears in the Church of the SubGenius recruitment film Arise! and has been used in the SubGenius newsgroup alt.slack.

== See also ==
- Apophenia
- Culture of fear
- Pareidolia
- Synchromysticism
- Synchronicity
- The Game (mind game)
- Thought-terminating cliché
