= Discord (disambiguation) =

Discord is an online application for messaging and audio/video communication.

Discord may also refer to:

== Film and TV ==
- Discord (film), a 1933 British drama
- Discord (My Little Pony), a character from the 2010 television series My Little Pony: Friendship Is Magic

== Music ==
- Discord, dissonance in music
- Discord, a 1997 album by Ryuichi Sakamoto
- Discord (album), a 2004 album by Bomb Factory
- Discord, a 2004 album by Stewart Walker
- "Discord", a 2004 song by Bomb Factory from the album Discord
- "Discord", a 2006 song by the Fire Engines
- "Discord", a 2007 song by After Forever from the album After Forever
- "Fukyōwaon" (or "Discord"), a 2017 song by Keyakizaka46
- "Discord", a 2012 song by Odyssey Eurobeat from the My Little Pony: Friendship Is Magic fandom

== Places ==
- Discord, the name of a former unincorporated community in Kedron Township
- "Block of Discord", the English translation of Illa de la Discòrdia, a city block in Barcelona, Spain
- Cape Discord, a headland in Greenland

== Other uses ==
- Discordia, the Roman goddess of strife and discord, sometimes referred to as Discord; equivalent to the Greek Eris
- Quantum discord, a quantity in quantum information science
- Semantic discord, an argument arising when two parties assign different meanings to the same word

== See also ==
- The Apple of Discord, an object from Greek mythology that caused strife among the gods, or by metaphor the core, kernel, or crux of an argument
- Chaos
- Dischord Records, a punk and alternative record label
- Discordant (disambiguation)
- Discordia (disambiguation)
- Discordianism
