= Snafu =

Snafu or SNAFU may refer to:

== Military ==
- SNAFU ("Situation Normal: All Fucked/Fouled Up"), a slang expression of US military origin
- Merriell Shelton (1922–1993), nicknamed "Snafu", a US Marine portrayed in the 2010 TV miniseries The Pacific
- Private Snafu, a character from US World War II instructional cartoons
- SNAFU Principle, "Communication is only possible between equals"
- The SNAFU Special, a Douglas C-47 Skytrain airplane in operation during World War II

== Arts and entertainment ==
=== Music ===
- Snafu (band), a 1970s English rhythm and blues band
- Snafu (Snafu album), 1973
- SNAFU (Potty Mouth album), 2019
- Snafu, an album by East of Eden, 1970
- "Snafu", a song by Izzy Stradlin from Like a Dog, 2005
- "Snafu", a song by Yusef Lateef from Eastern Sounds, 1961
- "S.N.A.F.U.", a song by Vanilla Ice from Hard to Swallow, 1998

=== Other media ===
- "Snafu" (Agent Carter), a television episode
- Snafu (film), a 1945 American comedy film starring Robert Benchley and Conrad Janis
- Snafu (magazine), a 1950s Marvel Comics satirical comic book
- Snafu (video game), a 1981 game for Intellivision
- Snafu Comics, a webcomics site
- SNAFU Con, a former anime convention in Nevada, US
- Screwball Scramble, a toy that also went by the name "Snafu"
- My Youth Romantic Comedy Is Wrong, as I Expected, a light novel series & anime, often displayed as SNAFU

== Places ==
- Snafu Lakes, Yukon, Canada

== See also ==
- Snafu 10-31-'91, an album by the Radiators, 1992
