= Discordant =

The adjective discordant ('conflicting, disagreeing, at variance') may describe:

== Earth science ==
- Discordant rock, one that cuts across the existing bedding: as in one of the main types of igneous intrusion, or as in the sedimentary clastic dikes
- Discordant strata, rock layers with mismatches in the geologic record
- Discordant coastline, when the bands of rock run perpendicular to the coast
- Discordant drainage pattern, where the pattern of rivers and streams does not correlate with the underlying geology

== Other uses ==
- Discordant, or dissonant, sounds, in music
- Discordant pair of observations, in statistics
  - Discordant twins, in twin studies
- Serodiscordant relationship, where one of the partners is HIV-positive and the other is not

== See also ==
- Discordianism
- Discord (disambiguation)
- Dissonance (disambiguation)
