= Super Shot Soccer =

2002 video game

- North American cover art
- Developer: Tecmo
- Publisher: Tecmo
- Composer: Hiroshi Miyazaki
- Platform: PlayStation
- Release: NA: June 5, 2002; JP: July 25, 2002
- Genre: Arcade-style traditional soccer simulation
- Modes: Single-player, multiplayer

Super Shot Soccer, known in Japan as Tecmo Sports Daiichi-dan Bakuretsu Soccer (テクモスポーツ第一弾 爆烈サッカー, Tekumosupōtsu Daiichi-dan Bakuretsu Sakkā; lit. "Tecmo Sports Number One Shot Explosive Soccer"), is a 2002 soccer simulation video game developed and published by Tecmo for the PlayStation. It is Tecmo's second and last soccer game released for the PlayStation, after J-League Soccer: Jikkyō Survival League.

== Gameplay ==
Japanese cover art

A Spanish player performing the "Matador Shot"

Released at the height of the 2002 FIFA World Cup and late in the PlayStation's life, the game features 32 national teams who have qualified for the 2002 World Cup with Captain Tsubasa-alike or superhuman soccer players that have at least two special powers, ranging from special passes to protective abilities to a boost in speed to auxiliary skills. In addition to the 32 qualified teams, the game also features teams that should have won a place at the final tournament but failed to in real life, such as FR Yugoslavia and the Netherlands, as well as a team representing Hong Kong consisting of the cast of Shaolin Soccer. These teams are not available at the beginning.

The player also has a few typical customizable options, but its main draw is the special abilities and team match-ups.

The powers of each team are based on their respective country's cultural symbols. For example, the Danish team can make a Viking longship to temporarily block a path to goal and stop high balls. When playing as the United States, a player can turn into the Statue of Liberty to prevent opponents from scoring. The Saudis can make opponents slip on a large puddle of oil in reference to the country's oil wealth, while one of the Paraguayans' special abilities is also a reference to Shaolin Soccer, where the goalkeeper throws the ball straight at the goal, mowing down opponents along the way. The abilities can be executed with L1 plus either Triangle, Square or X. Different special moves use different amounts of players' teams special energy. Also, every team has a powerful player with an "S" over their head, who can make attacks they specialize in more powerful. The players can also use old-fashioned passes and footwork to outmaneuver its opponent, though characters move a little stiffly, especially on turns. It was done in part to simulate more realistic movement.

== Music ==
The song from the opening film is called "Dive" from the EP Bomb Factory, performed by the Japanese band Bomb Factory and produced by Hell Hornet Records. "Crack" from the album Go This Way plays during the game ending.

== Reception ==
Reception

Aggregate score
| Aggregator | Score |
|---|---|
| Metacritic | 70/100 |

Review scores
| Publication | Score |
|---|---|
| AllGame | 3/5 |
| Famitsu | 25/40 |
| GameSpot | 6.5/10 |
| GameZone | 6.8/10 |
| Official U.S. PlayStation Magazine | 3.5/5 |

The game received "average" reviews according to the review aggregation website Metacritic. In Japan, Famitsu gave it a score of 25 out of 40.

== See also ==
- List of association football video games
