= Eye in the Pyramid =

Eye in the Pyramid may refer to:

- Eye of Providence, an ancient symbol
- The Eye in the Pyramid, a 1975 book in The Illuminatus! Trilogy by Robert Shea and Robert Anton Wilson
