= Go Hard =

Go Hard may refer to:

- "Go Hard" (DJ Khaled song), 2008
- "Go Hard" (Lil Baby song), 2023
- "Go Hard" (Meovv song), 2026
- "Go Hard (La.La.La)", by Kreayshawn, 2012
- Go-Hard, a 1996 album by Junk Yard Band
- Go Hard, an EP by Boys Noize
- "Go Hard", a 2002 song by Benzino from Undisputed (soundtrack)
- "Go Hard", a 1994 song by Bomb Factory from Explode a Bombshell
- "Go Hard", a 2007 song by Brand Nubian from Time's Runnin' Out
- "Go Hard", a 2012 song by Brymo from The Son of a Kapenta
- "Go Hard", a 2008 song by Chamillionaire from Mixtape Messiah 4
- "Go Hard", a 2013 song by Da Mafia 6ix from 6ix Commandments
- "Go Hard", a 2009 song by Hayes from More than a Game (soundtrack)
- "Go Hard", a 2021 song by Juice Wrld from Fighting Demons
- "Go Hard", a 2008 song by Lecrae from Rebel
- "Go Hard", a 2002 song by Lil Wayne from 500 Degreez
- "Go Hard", a 2010 song by Keak Da Sneak from Mobb Boss
- "Go Hard", a 2014 song by Kevin Gates from By Any Means
- "Go Hard", a 2009 song by Killah Priest from I Killed the Devil Last Night
- "Go Hard", a 1999 song by Michael Monroe from Life Gets You Dirty
- "Go Hard", a 1995 song by Northeast Groovers from Jams
- "Go Hard", a 2018 song by Olly Murs from You Know I Know
- "Go Hard", a 2008 song by Prima J from Prima J
- "Go Hard", a 1999 song by Q-Tip from Amplified
- "Go Hard", a 2015 song by Rawsrvnt from Game Changer
- "Go Hard", a 2015 song by Redman from Mudface
- "Go Hard", a 2013 song by Rich Boy from Break the Pot
- "Go Hard", a 2008 song by Skatterman & Snug Brim from Word on the Streets
- "Go Hard", a 2020 song by Twice from Eyes Wide Open
- "Go Hard", a 2017 song by Will Pan from Illi
- "Go Hard", a 2003 song by Yukmouth from Godzilla
