= Social Suicide =

Social Suicide may refer to:

- Social suicide
- Social Suicide (album), a 2006 album by Bomb Factory
- Social Suicide (film), a 2015 British romantic drama thriller
