= Star Factory =

Star Factory may refer to:

== Arts and entertainment ==
- Fabrika Zvyozd ("Star Factory"; Russian: Фабрика звёзд, lit. 'Factory of Stars'), Russian television talent show
- Fabryka Zirok ("Star Factory"; Ukrainian: Фабрика зірок, lit. 'Factory of Stars'), Ukrainian televised talent show
- Starfactory (stageplay), a play by Hungarian rock band Rocktenors
- The Star Factory (book), a 1997 memoir by Ciaran Carson
- "Sternefabrik" (TV segment; German: Star Factory), a TV show game event on Ich bin ein Star – Holt mich hier raus! (season 14) (German: I'm a Star - Get Me Out of Here, season 14)
- Star Factory (developer), Japanese videogame developer

== Places ==
- 4645 Tentaikojo (Japanese: 天体工場, romanized: Tentaikōjō, lit. 'Star Factory'), an asteroid in the Asteroid Belt of the Solar System
- Star Factory (factory), a factory in Herrnhut, Germany, that built Moravian stars
- Starfactory (factory), the construction facility for SpaceX Starships at SpaceX Starbase
- Star Factory (factory), Derry, Northern Ireland, UK; a listed building; see List of Grade B+ listed buildings in County Londonderry
- Star Factory (museum) (Japanese: 天体工場, romanized: Tentaikōjō, lit. 'Star Factory'), Sapporo, Japan

== See also ==
- Factory Star (band), British post-punk band
- Factory (disambiguation)
- Star (disambiguation)
- Stellar nursery in astronomy, a region where astrophysical stars are born
