= Land of the Rising Sound, Vol. 1 =

Compilation album by Various Artists
- Released: May 13, 2008
- Genre: Punk rock
- Label: N2O

Land of the Rising Sound, Vol. 1 is a Japanese compilation album released in 2008 by N2O Entertainment.

== Track listing ==
No.	Title	Artist	Length
1.	"Exciter"	Bomb Factory	3:35
2.	"Surf 99"	Uzumaki	3:31
3.	"Discord"	Bomb Factory	3:02
4.	"N2O Collaboration"	N8LOC, Raw, Uzumaki	3:46
5.	"Kyou No Story"	No High Roller	3:32
6.	"Smoothrider"	Smorgas	3:26
7.	"All the Way"	Bomb Factory	2:38
8.	"Radio 8.15Khz"	Uzumaki	2:45
9.	"Secret Admirer"	Datura	5:56
10.	"Revolution"	No High Roller	4:02
11.	"Deadman"	Smorgas	3:57
12.	"Drifting Away"	Fade	4:29
13.	"P.O.P."	No High Roller	3:47
14.	"Beautiful (Live)"	Fade	5:54
Total length:			45:16
