= SNAFU (Potty Mouth album) =

Studio album by Potty Mouth
- Released: March 1, 2019
- Genres: Pop rock; pop punk
- Length: 31:09
- Label: Get Better
- Producer: Courtney Ballard

Potty Mouth chronology
Potty Mouth (2015)	SNAFU (2019)	1% Happier (2021)

Singles from SNAFU
- 1. "Smash Hit" Released: October 7, 2016; 2. "22" Released: January 13, 2019; 3. "Starry Eyes" Released: February 14, 2019

SNAFU is the second and final studio album by the American pop rock girl band Potty Mouth. It was released on March 1, 2019, six years after their debut album Hell Bent.

== Track listing ==
No.	Title	Writer(s)	Length
1.	"Do It Again"	Abby Weems; Ally Einbinder, Victoria Mandanas; John Engelbert; Mattias Franzen	3:20
2.	"22"	Weems; Einbinder; Mandanas; Patrik Berger; Markus Krunegard	3:07
3.	"Starry Eyes"	Weems; Einbinder; Mandanas; Berger; Krunegard	3:47
4.	"Liar"	Weems; Einbinder; Mandanas; Courtney Ballard	2:55
5.	"Fencewalker"	Weems; Einbinder; Mandanas; Gina Schock; Trey Vittetoe	2:46
6.	"Massachusetts"	Weems; Einbinder; Mandanas; Tom Peyton; Ryan Spraker; Frederik Thaae	2:43
7.	"Plastic Paradise"	Weems; Einbinder; Mandanas; Joel Sjoo; Andreas Soderlund	3:36
8.	"Smash Hit"	Weems; Einbinder; Mandanas; Chris Walla	3:22
9.	"Dog Song"	Weems; Einbinder; Phoebe Harris; Mandanas	2:39
10.	"Bottom Feeder"	Weems; Einbinder; Mandanas; Engelbert; Franzen	2:57
Total length:			31:12

B-sides

- "I Wanna" (
  - Weems
  - Einbinder
  - Mandanas
  ) – 2:52
- "The Easy Way" (
  - Weems
  - Einbinder
  - Mandanas
  )

== Personnel ==
Potty Mouth

- Abby Weems – lead vocals, background vocals, guitar
- Ally Einbinder – bass
- Victoria Mandanas – drums, background vocals

Additional personnel

- Courtney Ballard – production
