= Potty Mouth (band) =

American punk rock band (2011–2021)

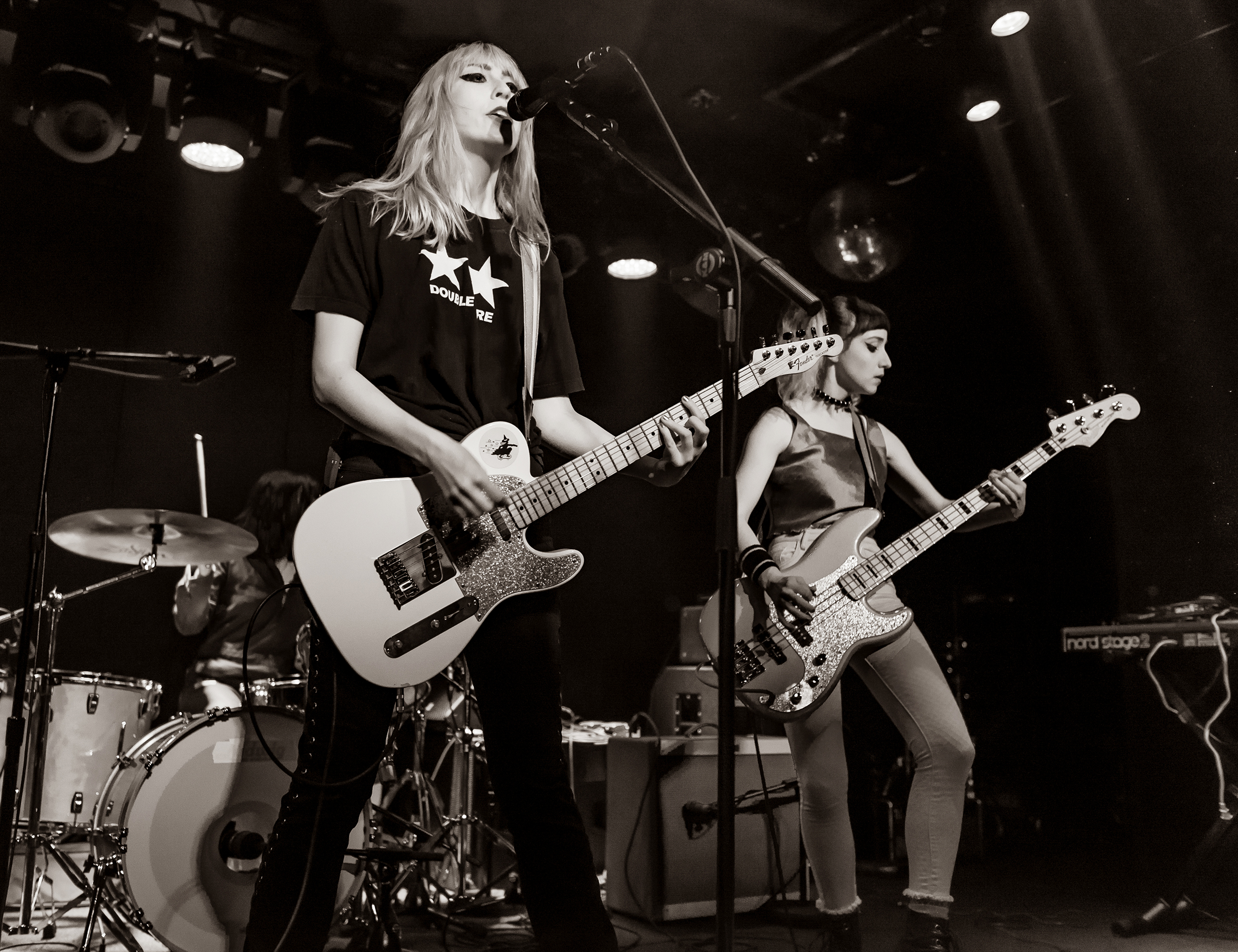
- Potty Mouth performing in 2018

Background information
- Origin: Northampton, Massachusetts, U.S.
- Genres: Pop rock, punk rock, pop punk
- Years active: 2011–2021
- Labels: Old Flame, Marshall Teller, Get Better
- Past members: Abby Weems; Ally Einbinder; Victoria Mandanas; Phoebe Harris; Ali Donohue
- Website: www.pottymouthworld.com

Potty Mouth was an American pop rock band, formed in Western Massachusetts, in 2011 at Smith College. The band's original lineup was Ally Einbinder (bass), Phoebe Harris (lead guitar, vocals), Abby Weems (lead vocals, rhythm guitar), and Victoria Mandanas (drums). Following Harris' (and later Ali Donohue's) departure, Potty Mouth continued as a three-piece, with Abby Weems on lead guitar.

== History ==
Potty Mouth was formed by Ally Einbinder and Phoebe Harris, two Smith College students, in 2011. Einbinder played bass while Harris learned to play the guitar. Another Smith College student, Victoria Mandanas, joined the band to play drums, having played in a punk rock band in high school; Abby Weems, a high school student at the time, also joined to play guitar and sing lead vocals. Like Harris, Weems did not know how to play guitar before joining Potty Mouth. In September 2011, the band recorded four demo tracks. According to Einbinder, Harris thought of the band's name while on the toilet, unaware of the Bratmobile album of the same name.

In 2013, Potty Mouth released their first full-length album, Hell Bent, to positive reviews from critics. In 2015, they released a self-titled EP, which was recorded without Harris, who had departed from the band. The band's tour to promote the EP featured various guest rhythm guitarists. During this time, they made a distribution deal with Alternative Distribution Alliance and gained attention from Atlantic Records. The band continued to tour in 2016, supporting Beach Slang's spring tour. For their 2016 shows, Potty Mouth was joined by guitarist Aurore Ounjian of Mean Creek. In July, the band played at Lollapalooza, their first music festival.

Potty Mouth's second album, SNAFU, was released on March 1, 2019, preceded by two singles: "22" in January and "Starry Eyes" in February. The album received significant praise from the critics. Pitchfork's Nina Corcoran awarded the album a 7.2 rating and labelled it, "an arena-sized follow up that sounds like a major-label effort without all the compromises." Writing for i-D, Nick Fulton called it "a career-defining moment for the Massachusetts band."

Potty Mouth announced they had disbanded on October 28, 2021. The band's final EP, 1% Happier, was released November 19, 2021.

== Style ==
Einbinder and Weems have expressed disapproval of the labeling of the band as riot grrrl. Einbinder stated that "Slapping the riot grrrl label on us just because we happen to be women playing a type of music that happens to be reminiscent of another era in time seems like a lazy conflation." Weems speculated that the association may have been due to the low fidelity of their early recordings.

In a Pitchfork review of Hell Bent, Jenn Pelly described Weems's vocals as a "Liz Phair-style monotone", delivering "deceptively simple lyrics". Writing for the Toronto Star, Ben Rayner wrote that Weems "sounds like she's perpetually rolling her eyes at everything and everyone in scorn". Jenn Pelly and Liz Pelly also compare the band's sound to pop-punk and post-punk with vestiges of surf music.

== Members ==
Final lineup

- Abby Weems – lead vocals, guitar (2011–2021)
- Ally Einbinder – bass (2011–2021)
- Victoria Mandanas – drums, backing vocals (2011–2021)

Final touring member lineup

- Kate Meizner – guitar, backing vocals (2014–2021)

Former members

- Phoebe Harris – guitar, occasional lead vocals, backing vocals (2011–2014)
- Ali Donohue – guitar, backing vocals (2014)

Timeline

== Discography ==
=== Studio albums ===
- Hell Bent (2013)
- SNAFU (2019)

=== Extended plays ===
- Sun Damage (2012)
- Potty Mouth (2015)
- 1% Happier (2021)

=== Singles ===
- "The Spins" (2013)
- "Black and Studs" (2013)
- "Damage" (2013)
- "Cherry Picking" (2015)
- "Smash Hit" (2016)
- "22" (2019)
- "Starry Eyes" (2019)
- "I Wanna" (2019)
- "Favorite Food" (2019)
- "Let Go" (2021)
- "Contessa Barefoot" (2021)
- "Not Going Anywhere" (2021)
- The Wild Honey Pie Buzzsession (2019) (live)
