= Calibration (Is Pushing Luck and Key Too Far) =

Studio album by Omar Rodríguez-López
- Released: December 15, 2007
- Recorded: 2005–2007
- Genre: Experimental rock, acid jazz, electronica
- Length: 53:33
- Label: N2O Records
- Producer: Omar Rodríguez-López

Omar Rodríguez-López solo chronology
The Apocalypse Inside of an Orange (2007)	Calibration (Is Pushing Luck and Key Too Far) (2007)	Omar Rodriguez-Lopez & Jeremy Michael Ward (2008)

Omar Rodríguez-López chronology
Amputechture (2006)	Calibration (Is Pushing Luck and Key Too Far) (2007)	The Bedlam in Goliath (2008)

Professional ratings
Review scores
Source	Rating
AllMusic	link
Artist direct	link
Twisted Ear	link
Alternative Press	3/5 stars

Calibration (Is Pushing Luck and Key Too Far) is the fifth studio album by Omar Rodríguez-López. The album was released through N2O Records in Japan on December 15, 2007, with a following U.S. release later on February 5, 2008, one week after The Mars Volta's The Bedlam in Goliath.

Calibration is described on Rodríguez-López's Bandcamp page as a collaborative affair "made from in-depth studio sessions with many guest musicians and field recordings from the loneliest place in Mexico".

The album art was illustrated by graffiti artist GREY, a childhood friend of Rodriguez-Lopez's.

According to the label, the original title given to them by Omar was "Calibration Is Pushing Luck and Key Too Far" but the "Is Pushing Luck and Key Too Far" part of the title appeared nowhere on the physical release.

== Track listing ==
All tracks are written by Omar Rodríguez-López, unless noted.

No.	Title	Writer(s)	Length
1.	"Mexico"		3:00
2.	"El Monte T'aï"		2:33
3.	"Una Ced Lacerante"		2:47
4.	"Calibration"	Omar Rodríguez-López, Cedric Bixler-Zavala	3:36
5.	"Grey (Canción para Él)"		3:29
6.	"Glosa Picaresca Wou Mên"	Rodríguez-López, John Frusciante	3:27
7.	"Sidewalk Fins"		6:32
8.	"Lick the Tilting Poppies"		5:17
9.	"Cortar el Cuello"		3:24
10.	"...Is Pushing Luck"	Rodríguez-López, Bixler-Zavala	8:11
11.	"Las Lágrimas de Arakuine"		11:11
Total length:			53:33

== Release history ==
Region	Date	Label
Japan	December 15, 2007 /Re-Issued April 25, 2011	N2O Records
United States	February 5, 2008 /Re-Issued April 25, 2011	N2O Records
United Kingdom	February 25, 2008 /Re-Issued April 25, 2011	N2O Records
United States (2LP vinyl)	November 11, 2008	N2O Records
United Kingdom (2LP)	December 2023	Clouds Hill Recordings

== Sales ==
Calibration was Omar's second album to chart on a Billboard music chart and his highest charting yet, peaking at #29 on the Top Heatseekers chart .

== Personnel ==
- Omar Rodríguez-López – guitars, bass (6–8), synthesizer (1, 3, 6–8, 11), Mexican harp (1), vocals & lyrics (2,7,8), vocals (4), Wurlitzer (3), tea kettle (3), TVs (5), rhodes (7), drum machine (7), clavinet (8)
- Juan Alderete – bass (1, 2, 4, 7, 10, 11)
- Thomas Pridgen – drums (1, 7, 11)
- Marcel Rodriguez-Lopez – drums (2, 4, 6, 8, 10), percussion (2, 6, 10), synthesizer (1, 6, 7, 11), clavinet (6)
- Adrián Terrazas-González – woodwinds & percussion (2, 10)
- Money Mark – synthesizer (2, 10)
- Cedric Bixler-Zavala – vocals & lyrics (4, 10)
- John Frusciante – vocals & lyrics (6)
- Sara Christina Gross – saxophone (7)
- Tina Rodriguez – voice (1, 6)
- Kim Humphreys – violin (2, 5, 8, 10, 11)
