= Hell Bent (album) =

Studio album by Potty Mouth
- Released: September 17, 2013
- Recorded: December 2012 at Dead Air Studios in Leverett, MA
- Genres: Pop punk; punk rock; riot grrrl
- Length: 34:46
- Label: Old Flame

Potty Mouth chronology
Sun Damage (2012)	Hell Bent (2013)	Potty Mouth (2015)

Singles from Hell Bent
- 1. "The Spins" Released: June 7, 2013; 2. "Black and Studs" Released: August 13, 2013; 3. "Damage" Released: September 17, 2013

Hell Bent is the debut studio album by Potty Mouth. It was released on September 16, 2013.

== Singles ==
"The Spins" was released June 7, 2013.

"Black and Studs" was released August 13, 2013.

"Damage" was released September 17, 2013.

== Composition ==
Singer Abby Weems wrote the majority of the album's lyrics.

== Reception ==
Professional ratings
Review scores
Source	Rating
AllMusic	3.5/5 stars

Allmusic gives Hell Bent 3.5 stars out of 5.

== Track listing ==
All tracks are written by Abby Weems, Ally Einbinder, Phoebe Harris, and Victoria Mandanas.

No.	Title	Length
1.	"The Gap"	3:03
2.	"Rusted Shut"	2:40
3.	"Black and Studs"	3:57
4.	"Sleep Talk"	2:57
5.	"The Spins"	3:32
6.	"Damage"	4:13
7.	"Wishlist"	3:03
8.	"Bullseye"	3:00
9.	"Shithead"	3:00
10.	"The Better End"	5:21
Total length:		34:46

== Personnel ==
Potty Mouth

- Abby Weems – lead vocals, rhythm guitar
- Ally Einbinder – bass
- Phoebe Harris – lead guitar, co-lead vocals (uncredited) on "The Better End"
- Victoria Mandanas – drums

Additional personnel

- Will Killingsworth – mixing
- Carl Saff – mastering
