= Blade of a Knife =

Studio album by Bomb Factory
- Released: August 15, 1996
- Genres: Hard rock Hardcore punk Heavy metal
- Label: Monster Company

Bomb Factory chronology
Explode a Bombshell (1994)	Blade of a Knife (1996)	Monstar Cup Stage 1 (1997)

Blade of a Knife is the first full-length album by punk rock band Bomb Factory. It was released in August 1996 on the independent label, Monster Company.

== Track listing ==
All tracks are written by Bomb Factory.

No.	Title	Length
1.	"She"
2.	"Ordinary World"
3.	"The Door to Glory"
4.	"Blade of a Knife"
5.	"Love Song"
6.	"On the Street"
7.	"Crow"
8.	"Destination"
9.	"Deadlock"
10.	"What's Goin' On"
11.	"So What"
12.	"1995"
