= Factory Butte =

Factory Butte may refer to:

- Factory Butte (Emery County, Utah), United States
- Factory Butte (Wayne County, Utah), United States
