= Dissonance =

Dissonance may refer to:

- Cognitive dissonance, a state of mental conflict
- Cultural dissonance, an uncomfortable sense experienced by people in the midst of change in their cultural environment
- Consonance and dissonance in music, properties of an interval or chord (the quality of a discord)
- Dissonance in poetry, the deliberate avoidance of assonance, i.e. patterns of repeated vowel sounds, similar to cacophony and the opposite of euphony
- Dissonance (album), a 2009 album by Enuff Z'Nuff
- Dissonance (film), a 2015 German short film
- "Dissonance", a 2023 song by Lovebites from the album Judgement Day

== See also ==
- Dissonants, a 2016 album by Hands Like Houses
