= Explode a Bombshell =

EP by Bomb Factory
- Released: December 1994
- Genre: Hard rock Hardcore punk Heavy metal

Bomb Factory chronology
| Explode a Bombshell (1994) | Blade of a Knife (1996) |

Explode a Bombshell is the first mini-album CD release by punk rock band Bomb Factory. The album was an independent release and is extremely rare. It is unknown how many pressings were produced. References to the album on the band's official website are also obscure and often omitted.

== Track listing ==
1. "Wild Life"
2. "Sick to You"
3. "Go Hard"
4. "Break Out"
5. "Gobble Up"
6. "United Warriors"
7. "Burly Boys"
