= Discord (album) =

Compilation album by Bomb Factory
- Released: September 30, 2004 (Europe)
- Genres: Hard rock Punk rock Hardcore punk
- Label: MHP Records/Skalopards Productions

Bomb Factory chronology
| Pilot Wire (single) (2004) | Discord (2004) | Another Day, Another Life (2004) |

Discord is a compilation album by punk rock band Bomb Factory. It was released exclusively in Europe on MHP/Skalopards Records and includes all tracks from the Discord maxi single and Fat Boost mini album (with the exception of the hidden track), as well as the popular track "Exciter".

== Track listing ==
All tracks are written by Bomb Factory.

| No. | Title | Length |
|---|---|---|
| 1. | "Awaited Time" | 4:00 |
| 2. | "Holiday" | 4:24 |
| 3. | "Discord" | 3:00 |
| 4. | "In the Sun" | 3:48 |
| 5. | "Roller Coaster" | 3:55 |
| 6. | "23 Hours" | 3:30 |
| 7. | "Dog Race" | 3:17 |
| 8. | "Worst-Case" | 3:08 |
| 9. | "Hangover" | 3:31 |
| 10. | "Today" | 4:23 |
| 11. | "Exciter" | 3:31 |
