= SNAFU Principle =

Principle in Discordianism

The SNAFU Principle is a popular principle in Discordianism. It states that Communication is only possible between equals. In any hierarchy (business, government, military, etc.) people and employees inevitably distort the truth of reports when dealing with their superiors, in order to avoid any punishment for relaying bad news. As a result, the superiors often operate from a distorted view of the situation, sometimes leading to poor results.

SNAFU was first a United States military acronym meaning "Situation Normal, All Fucked Up", sometimes Bowdlerized as "situation normal, all fouled up".

== See also ==
- Private Snafu
