= Factory (disambiguation) =

A factory is an industrial site where goods are manufactured or processed.

Factory or The Factory may also refer to:

== Arts, entertainment and media ==
=== Film and television ===
- The Factory (2012 film), an American crime thriller
- The Butchers (film), also known as The Factory, a 2014 horror film
- The Factory (2018 film), a Russian thriller
- Factory (TV series), a 2008 American comedy series
- The Factory (Australian TV series), 1987–1989
- "The Factory" (The Amazing World of Gumball), an episode of the British-American animated series The Amazing World of Gumball
- Factory (Code Lyoko), a fictional location in the French animated series Code Lyoko

=== Music ===
- Factory (band), a Swedish band 1978–1982
- The Factory, a predecessor to the American band Paramore
- The Factory, a 1960s band featuring Lowell George
- Factory Records, a British record label 1978–1992

==== Albums ====
- The Factory (album), a 1999 album by Seven Nations
- Factory, a 2014 album by Buckethead
- Factory, a 1979 album by Factory (band)

==== Songs ====
- "Factory" (song), a 2010 song by Band of Horses
- "The Factory" (song), a song recorded by Kenny Rogers in 1988
- "Factory", a song by The Vines, from the 2002 album Highly Evolved
- "Factory", a song by Bruce Springsteen, from the 1978 album Darkness on the Edge of Town
- "Factory", a song by Simple Minds, from the 1979 album Real to Real Cacophony
- "Factory", a song by Wall of Voodoo, from the album Call of the West
- "The Factory", a song by Warren Zevon, from the 1987 album Sentimental Hygiene

==== Literature ====
- The Factory (novel), a novel by Japanese author Hiroko Oyamada

=== Arts organisations and venues ===
- The Factory, Andy Warhol's New York City studio 1963–1968
- The Factory (Manchester), a future arts venue
- The Factory (music venue), a music venue in Manchester, England
- The Factory Theatre Company, an English theatre company

== Other uses ==
- Factory (object-oriented programming), an object for creating other objects
- Factory (trading post), a medieval and early modern era transshipment point
- Factory, a development code base for openSUSE software
- Factory, a British animation studio and producer of the show Norman Picklestripes

== See also ==
- Factory Butte (disambiguation), two summits in Utah, US
- Factory system, the method of manufacturing using factories
