= Closed (album) =

Studio album by Bomb Factory
- Released: December 1, 2010
- Genres: Hard rock Punk rock Hardcore punk
- Length: 38:21
- Label: Sea Green/Toshiba EMI
- Producer: Bomb Factory

Bomb Factory chronology
Social Suicide (2006)	Closed (2010)	Rage and Hope (2013)

Closed is the sixth full-length album by punk rock band Bomb Factory. It was released in December 2010 on Monstar Records, and contains 11 songs.

== Track listing ==
All tracks are written by Bomb Factory.

No.	Title	Length
1.	"All Right"	2:50
2.	"Fly"	3:23
3.	"Infected"	3:33
4.	"Waiting for You"	3:51
5.	"Might Be Wrong"	3:24
6.	"Slide a Gun"	3:17
7.	"Strance"	3:38
8.	"Bigday"	3:47
9.	"Ordinary World"	2:34
10.	"Todoboy"	4:01
11.	"The Story Ends"	4:03
