= Kerry Wendell Thornley =

American author (1938–1998)

Kerry Thornley
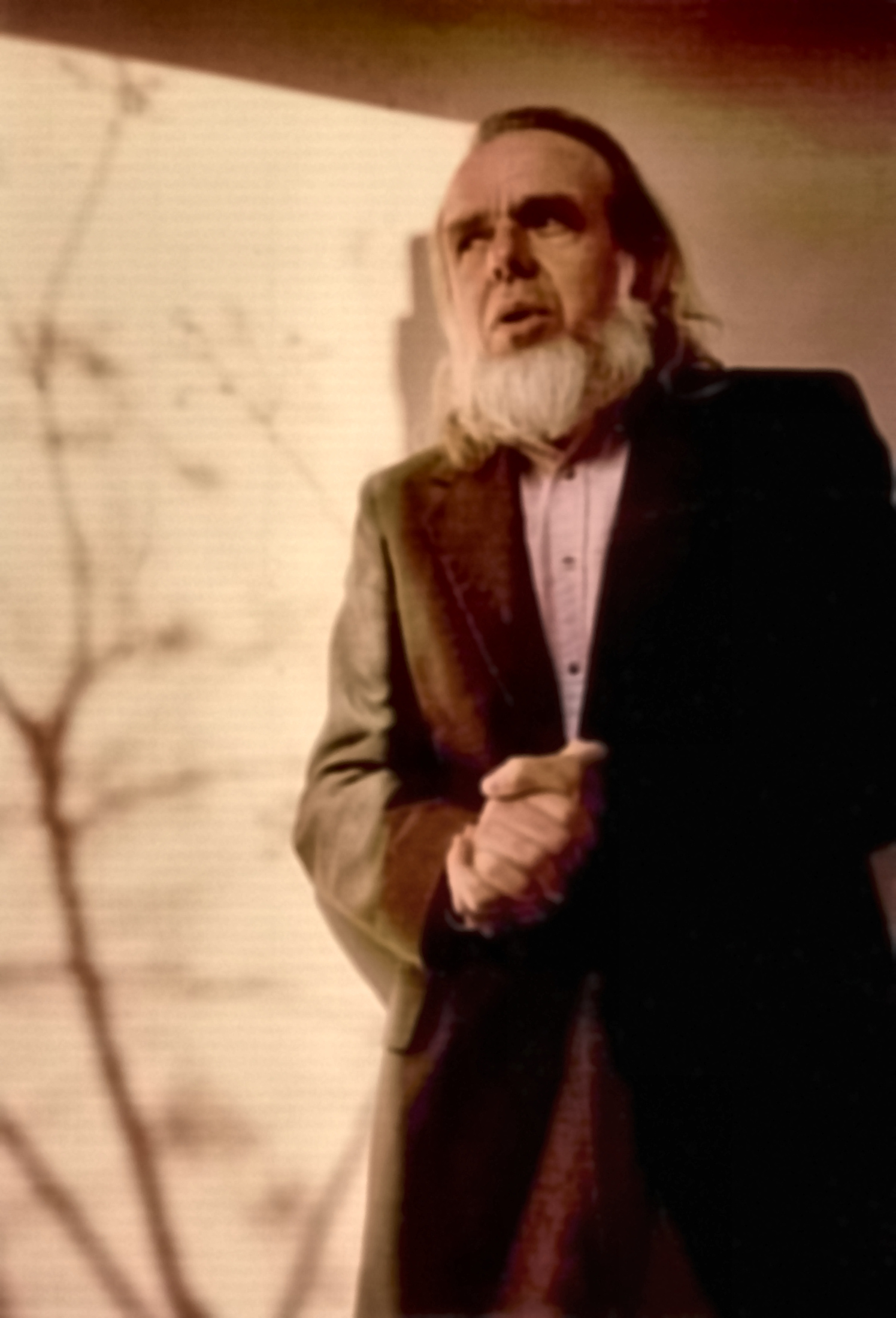
- Born: April 17, 1938; Los Angeles, California
- Died: November 28, 1998 (aged 60); Atlanta, Georgia, U.S.
- Education: University of Southern California (no degree)
- Spouse: Cara Leach (1965–?)
- Children: 1
- Writing career
- Pen name: Lord Omar Khayyam Ravenhurst; Ho Chi Zen
- Period: 1950s–1990s
- Genre: Counterculture
- Subjects: Religion, politics, satire

Kerry Wendell Thornley (April 17, 1938 – November 28, 1998) was an American author. He is known as the co-founder (along with childhood friend Greg Hill) of Discordianism, in which context he is usually known as Omar Khayyam Ravenhurst or simply Lord Omar. He and Hill authored the religion's text Principia Discordia, Or, How I Found Goddess, and What I Did to Her When I Found Her. Thornley also was known for his 1962 manuscript The Idle Warriors, which was inspired by the activities of his acquaintance Lee Harvey Oswald before the 1963 assassination of John F. Kennedy.

Thornley was highly active in the countercultural publishing scene, writing for a number of underground magazines and newspapers, and self-publishing many one-page (or broadsheet) newsletters of his own. One such newsletter called Zenarchy was published in the 1960s under the pen name Ho Chi Zen. Zenarchy is described in the introduction of the collected volume as "the social order which springs from meditation", and "A noncombative, nonparticipatory, no-politics approach to anarchy intended to get the serious student thinking."

Raised Mormon, in adulthood Kerry shifted his ideological focus frequently, in rivalry with any serious countercultural figure of the 1960s. Among the subjects he closely scrutinized throughout his life were atheism, anarchism, Objectivism, autarchism (he attended Robert LeFevre's Freedom School), neo-paganism, Kerista, Buddhism, and the memetic inheritor of Discordianism, the Church of the SubGenius.

== Personal life ==
Kerry Wendell Thornley was born on April 17, 1938, in Los Angeles to Kenneth and Helen Thornley. He had two younger brothers, Dick and Tom.

Thornley attended California High School in Whittier, California.

On Saturday, December 11, 1965, Kerry married Cara Leach at Wayfarers Chapel in Palos Verdes, California. They had one son, Kreg Thornley, born in 1969. They later divorced. Kreg was a photographer, painter, musician and film maker.

== Military life ==
Having already been a reservist in the U.S. Marine Corps for about two years, Thornley had been summoned to active duty in 1958 at age 20, soon after completing his freshman year at the University of Southern California. According to Principia Discordia, it was around this time that he and Greg Hill—alias Malaclypse the Younger or Mal-2—shared their first Eristic vision in a bowling alley in their hometown of Whittier, California.

In early 1959, Thornley served for a short time in the same radar operator unit as Lee Harvey Oswald at MCAS El Toro in Santa Ana, California. Thornley claimed they shared a common interest in society, culture, literature and politics, and whenever duty placed them together, had discussed such topics as George Orwell's famous novel Nineteen Eighty-Four and the philosophy of Marxism, particularly Oswald's interest in the latter.

While aboard a troopship returning to the United States from duty in Japan (some time after the two men parted ways as a result of routine reassignment), Thornley read of Oswald's autumn 1959 defection to the Soviet Union in the U.S. military newspaper Stars and Stripes.

== 1960s ==
Thornley circa 1970

In February 1962, Thornley completed The Idle Warriors, which has the historical distinction of being the only book written about Lee Harvey Oswald before Kennedy's assassination in 1963. Due to the serendipitous nature of Thornley's choice of literary subject matter, he was called to testify before the Warren Commission in Washington, D.C., on May 18, 1964. The Commission subpoenaed a copy of the manuscript and stored it in the National Archives, and the book remained unpublished until 1991. In 1965, Thornley published another book titled Oswald, generally defending the "Oswald-as-lone-assassin" conclusion of the Warren Commission.

In January 1968, New Orleans district attorney Jim Garrison, certain there had been a New Orleans–based conspiracy to assassinate John F. Kennedy, subpoenaed Thornley to appear before a grand jury, questioning him about his relationship with Oswald and his knowledge of other figures Garrison believed to be connected to the assassination. Thornley sought a cancellation of this subpoena on which he had to appear before the Circuit Court. Garrison charged Thornley with perjury after Thornley denied that he had been in contact with Oswald in any manner since 1959. The perjury charge was eventually dropped by Garrison's successor Harry Connick Sr.

Thornley claimed that, during his initial two-year sojourn in New Orleans, he had numerous meetings with two mysterious middle-aged men named "Gary Kirstein" and "Slim Brooks". According to his account, they had detailed discussions on numerous subjects ranging from the mundane to the exotic, and bordering sometimes on bizarre. Among these was the subject of how one might assassinate President Kennedy, whose beliefs and policies the aspiring novelist deeply disliked at the time. Later, the former Marine came to believe that "Gary Kirstein" had in reality been senior CIA officer and future Watergate burglar E. Howard Hunt, and "Slim Brooks" to have been Jerry Milton Brooks, a member of the 1960s right-wing activist group The Minutemen. Guy Banister, another Minutemen member in New Orleans, had been accused by Garrison of involvement in the assassination and was allegedly connected to Lee Harvey Oswald through the Fair Play for Cuba Committee leaflet. Thornley also claimed that "Kirstein" and Brooks had accurately predicted Richard M. Nixon's accession to the presidency six years before it happened, as well as anticipating the rise of the 1960s counterculture and the subsequent emergence of Charles Manson and what became his cult following. This led Thornley to believe that the US government had somehow been involved, directly or indirectly, in creating and/or supporting these events, personages and phenomena.

After Shaw was acquitted, Thornley said he wanted Garrison to bring him to trial in order to clear his name.

== Later life and death ==
For the next 30 years, Thornley traveled and lived all over the United States and was involved in a variety of activities, ranging from editing underground newspapers to attending graduate school. He spent most of the remainder of his life in the Little Five Points neighborhood of Atlanta. During this time, he maintained a free series of fliers titled "Out of Order." This single page, double sided Xeroxed periodical was distributed in the Little Five Points area. Thornley became increasingly paranoid and distrustful in the wake of his experiences during the 1960s, both by his own accounts and those of personal acquaintances. For a time, Thornley wrote a regular column in the zine Factsheet Five until editor Mike Gunderloy stopped publishing the magazine. Struggling with illness in his final days, Kerry Thornley died of cardiac arrest in Atlanta on November 28, 1998, at the age of 60. The following morning, 23 people attended a Buddhist memorial service in his honor. His body had been cremated, and the ashes scattered over the Pacific Ocean. Shortly before his death, Thornley reportedly said he'd felt "like a tired child home from a very wild circus", a reference to a passage by Greg Hill from Principia Discordia:

And so it is that we, as men, do not exist until we do; and then it is that we play with our world of existent things, and order and disorder them, and so it shall be that Non-existence shall take us back from Existence, and that nameless Spirituality shall return to Void, like a tired child home from a very wild circus.

== List of pen names and titles ==
List of pen names and self-awarded titles provided by Kerry himself on the role of Pope of the Discordian Society in an affidavit to the California School Employees Association (CSEA), on a legal case concerning a member of the society that refused to join the CSEA alleging that the Discordian religion forbade him from doing so:

- co-founder of the Discordian Society and the Legion of Dynamic Discord thereof and co-author of Principia Discordia
- Grand Ballyhoo of Egypt of the Orthodox Discordian Society
- Kerry Wendell Thornley, JFK Assassin
- Omar Khayyam Ravenhurst
- President of the Fair-Play-for-Switzerland Committee
- Reverend Doctor Jesse Sump
- Ancient Abbreviated Calif. of California
- Sinister Minister of the First Evangelical and Unrepentant Church of No Faith
- Ho Chi Zen (the Fifth Dealy Lama)
- Purple Sage
- Pope
- "I further declare that there is no truth whatsoever to the charge that Kerry Wendell Thornley is a fictitious identity created by the Warren Commission for its own mysterious purposes (Vol. XI, pp. 80+, Commission Exhibits and Testimony)"

== Bibliography ==
- with Malaclypse the Younger (Greg Hill); Principia Discordia, or, How I found Goddess and what I did to Her when I found Her, 5th Edition, September 1991, IllumiNet Press (Introduction by Kerry Thornley) ISBN 0-9626534-2-X
- Thornley, Kerry; Oswald, New Classics House, 1965
- Thornley, Kerry; Zenarchy, IllumiNet Press, June 1991 ISBN 0-9626534-1-1
- Thornley, Kerry; The Idle Warriors, IllumiNet Press, June 1991 ISBN 0-9626534-0-3

== See also ==
- Omar Khayyam
- Rubaiyat of Omar Khayyam

== Notes ==
=== References ===
- Biles, Joe G.; In History's Shadow: Lee Harvey Oswald, Kerry Thornley & the Garrison Investigation, Writers Club Press, April 2002 (foreword by Robert Buras) ISBN 978-0-595-22455-5
- Gorightly, Adam; The Prankster and the Conspiracy: The Story of Kerry Thornley and How He Met Oswald and Inspired the Counterculture, Paraview Press, November 2003 (foreword by Robert Anton Wilson) ISBN 978-1-931044-66-0
- "Testimony of Kerry Wendell Thornley". Warren Commission Hearings, Volume XI. History Matters. May 18, 1964. pp. 82–115.
