= Bomb Factory (album) =

EP by Bomb Factory
- Released: November 1, 1999
- Genres: Hard rock Punk rock Hardcore punk
- Length: 26:30
- Label: Monstar Records/Hell Hornet Records

Bomb Factory chronology
How Do You Feel? (1999)	Bomb Factory (1999)	Break Up (2000)

Bomb Factory is the self-titled second EP by punk rock band Bomb Factory. It was released in November 1999 on Monstar Records/Hell Hornet Records, and contains seven songs. Tracks 1 and 7 were featured on the video game Dead or Alive 2 while track 2 was used in a promotional ad for the game. An English version of track 5 was made for the updated game DOA2: Hardcore.

== Track listing ==
1. "Exciter" – 3:31
2. "Free Chain" – 3:44
3. "Up Side Down" – 3:00
4. "Memory" – 5:09
5. "How Do You Feel" – 4:04
6. "Dive" – 4:02 (2002 Tecmo's game Super Shot Soccer soundtrack)
7. "Deadly Silence Beach" – 3:00
