= Go This Way =

Studio album by Bomb Factory
- Released: January 30, 2002
- Genre: Hard rock Punk rock Hardcore punk
- Label: Monstar Records/Hell Hornet Records

Bomb Factory chronology
Break Up (single) (2000)	Go This Way (2002)	Fat Boost (single) (2002)

Go This Way is the second full-length album by punk rock band Bomb Factory. It was released in January 2002 on Monstar Records/Hell Hornet Records, and contains 15 songs. Track 8 appears on Tecmo's Super Shot Soccer soundtrack for PlayStation.

== Track listing ==
All tracks are written by Bomb Factory

No.	Title	Length
1.	"Down"	2:48
2.	"Go Straight"	2:59
3.	"Jimmy's Backyard"	3:20
4.	"Remember"	3:21
5.	"Lost My Way"	1:41
6.	"Puke"	1:34
7.	"Easy"	2:58
8.	"Crack"	2:23
9.	"Break Up"	3:05
10.	"She"	3:33
11.	"Rage"	3:40
12.	"Sick of You"	2:55
13.	"Fling Your Angry Fist"	2:28
14.	"Break It Right Now"	3:43
15.	"One Day"	2:17
