= Fat Boost =

EP by Bomb Factory
- Released: December 4, 2002
- Genre: Hard rock Punk rock Hardcore punk
- Label: Monstar Records/Limited Records
- Producer: Bomb Factory

Bomb Factory chronology
| Go This Way (2002) | Fat Boost (2002) | Another Day, Another Life (2004) |

Fat Boost is the third mini-album by punk rock band Bomb Factory. It was released in December 2002 on Monstar/Limited, and contains six songs, plus one hidden track, which is an audio clip of someone vomiting.

== Track listing ==
- All music and lyrics written by Bomb Factory.
1. "Awaited Time" – 4:00
2. "Roller Coaster" – 3:54
3. "Hangover" – 3:31
4. "23 Hours" – 3:29
5. "Worst Case" – 3:08
6. "Holiday" – 4:23
7. "A Meal to Puke" – 0:48

== Personnel ==
- Jun-ya - vocals
- Kazuya - guitar, vocals
- Joe - bass guitar, vocals
- Shira - drums, vocals
