= Malaclypse the Younger =

American writer and co-founder of Discordianism

Gregory Hill
- Born: May 21, 1941; California, U.S.
- Died: July 20, 2000 (aged 59); San Francisco Bay Area, California, U.S.
- Spouse: Jeanetta Hill
- Writing career
- Pen name: Malaclypse the Younger
- Subjects: Religion, politics, satire

Gregory Hill (May 21, 1941 – July 20, 2000), better known by the pen name Malaclypse the Younger, was an American author. He is listed as author of the Principia Discordia, which was written with Kerry Wendell Thornley (a.k.a. Lord Omar Khayyam Ravenhurst) and others. He was also adapted as a character in The Illuminatus! Trilogy (1975). During the early years of circulation of the Principia Discordia, rumors claimed that the author of the book was Richard Nixon, Timothy Leary, or Robert Anton Wilson; or that the book and Malaclypse the Younger were both fictional inventions of Robert Anton Wilson, as with Abdul Alhazred's Necronomicon.

== Biography ==
Gregory H. Hill was born in California on Wednesday, May 21, 1941. He worked for Western Union while a young man in the Southern California area of Whittier, California.

Around 1958 or 1959 while still a teenager, he, Kerry Thornley and others began working on the Discordian religion.

In 1965, the first edition of Principia Discordia was printed, allegedly in five copies. The most famous edition was the fourth.

Hill spent much of his life working for Bank of America as a computer programmer, and moved to the San Francisco Bay Area. He had apparently visited there while a child.

Robert Anton Wilson stated, in the lecture "The I in the Triangle" from 1990, that Greg Hill was at the time the head of a large computer facility owned by one of the largest banks in the United States.

A designer of one of the early video games, Hill wrote about computers including editing a computer-oriented newsletter. He also published an article proposing using a computer to transmit signals to remotely control robots.

He was married to Jeanetta Ross; they later separated and may have divorced.

He died in the San Francisco Bay Area of California on the July 20, 2000. A long-time smoker, he died of cancer.

Greg Hill described Mal-2 as a spirit sent into him by Eris that helped him write the Principia Discordia over the course of ten years in his early adulthood. An interview included in the fourth edition of the Principia Discordia by Loompanics Press reveals that Mal-2 left once the book was finished. He claims Mal-2 returned to leave a fifth and final edition consisting solely of a Western Union telegraph form filled with the letter "M". Greg Hill also reveals that he had access to Western Union forms when he worked at Western Union.

== Principia Discordia ==
In 2006, a copy of the first edition of the Principia Discordia was claimed by Rev. DrJon Swabey to have been discovered in the President John F. Kennedy Assassination Records Collection in the National Archives, proving Malaclypse the Younger to be Gregory Hill. However, Adam Gorightly, compiler of Historia Discordia which claims to contain the actual first edition, said this was in error. Gorightly said he received the first edition from Dr. Robert Newport who had overseen the estate of Gregory Hill.

Possessing many titles, including "Omnibenevolent Polyfather of Virginity in Gold", Malaclypse's true identity or position within the Erisian religion is completely unknown. He is frequently mentioned in the Principia Discordia, credited with wiring telegrams to God from the Celestial Hotel and decrying the usefulness of prayer. These claims are in the nature of the Principia Discordia.

Very little is known about Malaclypse the Elder, the namesake of Mal-2. The Principia Discordia merely mentions him as a "non-prophet" and that he was mistaken for a doomsayer when carrying a sign that read "DUMB."

== Illuminatus! ==
Malaclypse the Younger also appears in The Illuminatus! Trilogy by Robert Shea and Robert Anton Wilson. According to Illuminatus!, he founded the Norton Cabal, and then left the cabal to join the very esoteric Erisian Liberation Front. The character Dr. Ignotum P. Ignotius says the last thing Mal-2 wrote before he left for the ELF was, "Everybody understands Mickey Mouse. Few understand Hermann Hesse. Hardly anyone understands Albert Einstein. And nobody understands Emperor Norton." This is the slogan of the Joshua Norton Cabal of San Francisco.

Malaclypse the Elder has an even larger role in The Illuminatus! Trilogy. In fact, he is an important shape-shifting character in the book, posing as Jean-Paul Sartre, Billy Graham, and the Devil. According to Malaclypse the Elder himself, he is a 4th century B.C. Erisian priest (who was also prepared to perform services to Hermes, Dionysus, Heracles, Aphrodite, Athena, and Hera) who achieved "transcendental illumination" in the course of the massacre at Melos in 415 BC. The Illuminati believe that death releases a certain form of energy. Given enough death and a person intent on capturing said energy, a person may be transformed into an immortal, immaterial being, or so the plot element goes. Malaclypse the Elder also posed as Jesus after Jesus was crucified. In the form of Jesus, he introduced Bingo, but asked Luke to not record it.

== Bibliography ==
- Malaclypse the Younger. Principia Discordia , 1st Edition, p. A7.
- _____. Principia Discordia, 4th Edition, 1980, Loompanics Unlimited. Introduction by Robert Anton Wilson. Afterword by Greg Hill.
- _____. Principia Discordia, 5th Edition, 1991, IllumiNet Press. Introduction by Kerry Thornley.
