= Principia Discordia =

1963 Discordian religious text

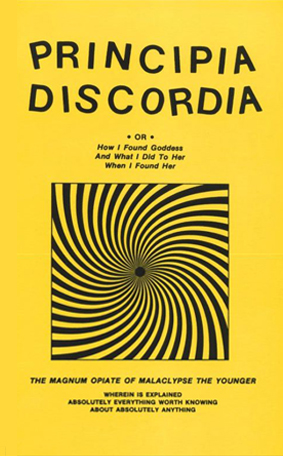
- The Loompanics "Yellow Cover" combined 4th and 5th Edition Principia Discordia, (1979). In print until the company went out of business in 2006.
- Author: Greg Hill and Kerry Wendell Thornley

The Principia Discordia is the first published Discordian religious text. It was written by Greg Hill (Malaclypse the Younger) with Kerry Wendell Thornley (Lord Omar Khayyam Ravenhurst) and others. The first edition was printed using Jim Garrison's Xerox printer in 1963. The second edition was published under the title Principia Discordia or How The West Was Lost in a limited edition of five copies in 1965. The phrase Principia Discordia, reminiscent of Isaac Newton's 1687 Principia Mathematica, is presumably intended to mean Discordant Principles, or Principles of Discordance.

The Principia describes the Discordian Society and its Goddess Eris, as well as the basics of the POEE denomination of Discordianism. It features typewritten and handwritten text intermixed with clip art, stamps, and seals appropriated from other sources. It is quoted extensively in and forms the basis for several themes within the satirical 1975 science fiction book The Illuminatus! Trilogy by Robert Shea and Robert Anton Wilson.

Notable symbols in the book include the Apple of Discord, the pentagon, and the "Sacred Chao", which resembles the Taijitu of Taoism, but the two principles depicted are "Hodge" and "Podge" rather than yin and yang, and they are represented by the apple and the pentagon, and not by dots. Saints identified include Emperor Norton, Yossarian, Don Quixote, and Bokonon. The Principia also introduces the mysterious word "fnord", later popularized in The Illuminatus! Trilogy; the trilogy itself is mentioned in the afterword to the Loompanics edition, and in the various introductions to the fifth editions.

== Overview ==
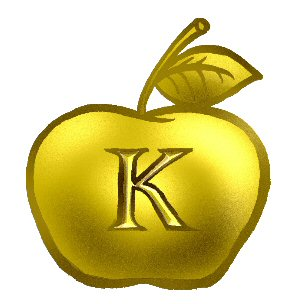
Golden Apple, symbol of Eris, Our Lady of Discord

The Principia Discordia holds three core principles: the Aneristic Principle (order), the Eristic Principle (disorder) and the notion that both are mere illusions. The following excerpt summarizes these principles:

The Aneristic Principle is that of apparent order; the Eristic Principle is that of apparent disorder. Both order and disorder are man made concepts and are artificial divisions of pure chaos, which is a level deeper than is the level of distinction making.

With our concept-making apparatus called "the brain" we look at reality through the ideas-about-reality which our cultures give us.

The ideas-about-reality are mistakenly labeled "reality" and unenlightened people are forever perplexed by the fact that other people, especially other cultures, see "reality" differently.

It is only the ideas-about-reality which differ. Real (capital-T) True reality is a level deeper than is the level of concept. We look at the world through windows on which have been drawn grids (concepts). Different philosophies use different grids. A culture is a group of people with rather similar grids. Through a window we view chaos, and relate it to the points on our grid, and thereby understand it. The order is in the grid. That is the Aneristic Principle.

Western philosophy is traditionally concerned with contrasting one grid with another grid, and amending grids in hopes of finding a perfect one that will account for all reality and will, hence, (say unenlightened westerners) be true. This is illusory; it is what we Erisians call the Aneristic Illusion. Some grids can be more useful than others, some more beautiful than others, some more pleasant than others, etc., but none can be more True than any other.

Disorder is simply unrelated information viewed through some particular grid. But, like "relation", no-relation is a concept. Male, like female, is an idea about sex. To say that male-ness is "absence of female-ness", or vice versa, is a matter of definition and metaphysically arbitrary. The artificial concept of no-relation is the Eristic Principle.

The belief that "order is true" and disorder is false or somehow wrong, is the Aneristic Illusion. To say the same of disorder, is the Eristic Illusion.

The point is that (little-t) truth is a matter of definition relative to the grid one is using at the moment, and that (capital-T) Truth, metaphysical reality, is irrelevant to grids entirely. Pick a grid, and through it some chaos appears ordered and some appears disordered. Pick another grid, and the same chaos will appear differently ordered and disordered.

Reality is the original Rorschach. Verily! So much for all that.

— Malaclypse the Younger, Principia Discordia

== History ==
The Sacred Chao

The Principia Discordia or How The West Was Lost was first published in a limited edition of five copies and released into the public domain in 1965. The full title of the fourth and most well-known edition is Principia Discordia or How I Found Goddess And What I Did To Her When I Found Her: The Magnum Opiate Of Malaclypse The Younger, Wherein is Explained Absolutely Everything Worth Knowing About Absolutely Anything. Included on page 75 is the following note about the history of the Principia:

This being the 4th Edition, March 1970, San Francisco; a revision of the 3rd Edition of 500 copies, whomped together in Tampa 1969; which revised the 2nd Edition of 100 copies from Los Angeles 1969; which was a revision of PRINCIPIA Discordia or HOW THE WEST WAS LOST published in New Orleans in 1965 in five copies, which were mostly lost.

Additionally, the "contents of this edition" note in the Loompanics edition identifies the fourth edition as having originally been published by Rip Off Press of San Francisco, California.

A "Fifth Edition" consisting of a single Western Union telegram page filled with the letter M was published as an appendix to the Loompanics and SJ Games re-printings of the 4th Edition.

In 1978, a copy of a work from Kerry Thornley titled "THE PRINCIPIA Discordia or HOW THE WEST WAS LOST" was placed in the HSCA JFK collections as document 010857. Adam Gorightly, author of The Prankster and the Conspiracy about Kerry Thornley and the early Discordians, said the copy in the JFK collection was not a copy of the first edition but a later and altered version containing some of the original material. Gorightly said he had been given Greg Hill's copy of the first edition. This appeared in its entirety in Historia Discordia, a book on Discordian history released in spring of 2014. In 2015 Gorightly stated that he now believed that the copy in the JFK collection was an earlier draft of the Principia Discordia predating the first edition.

The Principia includes a notice which purports to disclaim any copyright in relation to the work: "Ⓚ All Rites Reversed – reprint what you like." Regardless of the legal effect of this notice, the Principia has been widely disseminated in the public domain via the Internet and more traditional print publishers. Some re-publishers have claimed copyright in relation to the additional material included in their editions.

== Reprints of the fourth and fifth editions ==
- Revisionist Press published a red hardcover of the fourth edition in 1976, adding a stamp reading "This work is a bridge so move on thru" to the right of the golden apple on page 00075. (ISBN 0-685-75085-X)
- Loompanics Unlimited published a version (the "yellow cover version") in 1979, adding an introduction by Robert Anton Wilson, an afterword by Malaclypse the Younger, and the aforementioned "Fifth Edition". (ISBN 1-55950-040-9) This version is reprinted by Paladin Press under ISBN 1-58160-547-1.
- Steve Jackson Games published a version (the "black cover version") in 1994, adding an introduction by Steve Jackson and 20 pages of new Discordian text, mostly collected from online Discordians. (ISBN 1-55634-320-5) Steve Jackson Games also publishes Discordian and Illuminati-inspired games, such as GURPS Illuminati and the Illuminati card game.
- Last Word Press, of Olympia, Washington, released a series of reprints of the Loompanics/Paladin Press editions beginning in 2009, with a series of different cover designs and paper stocks, including a rainbow edition. Their 2015 edition is printed under ISBN 1-94423-406-3.
- FSoF Cabal's publishing division has published the "Evangelical" edition since 2009 (ISBN 978-1-387-76266-8).

== Mythology ==
In Discordian mythology, Aneris is described as the sister of Eris aka Discordia. Whereas Eris/Discordia is the Goddess of Disorder and Being, Aneris/Harmonia is the Goddess of Order and Non-Being.

"DOGMA III – HISTORY 32, 'COSMOGONY'" in Principia Discordia, states:

In the beginning there was VOID, who had two daughters; one (the smaller) was that of BEING, named ERIS, and one (the larger) was of NON-BEING, named ANERIS.

The sterile Aneris becomes jealous of Eris (who was born pregnant), and starts making existent things non-existent. This explains why life begins, and later ends in death:

And to this day, things appear and disappear in this very manner.

The names of Eris and Aneris (who are later given an in-between brother, Spirituality), are used to show some fundamental Discordian principles in "Psycho-Metaphysics":

The Aneristic Principle is that of APPARENT ORDER; the Eristic Principle is that of APPARENT DISORDER. Both order and disorder are man made concepts and are artificial divisions of PURE CHAOS, which is a level deeper than is the level of distinction making.

Cusack points out that this is "distilled into a teaching about the ultimate fate of humans: 'so it shall be that non-existence shall take us back from existence and that nameless spirituality shall return to the Void, like a tired child home from a very wild circus'.".

The book's philosophical system of Eristic, Spiritual, and Aneristic principles borrows from Zen Buddhism, Jainism, Hinduism, Christianity, and Existentialism.

== Theology ==
David G. Robertson discusses Discordian theology in the 2012 book Handbook of New Religions and Cultural Production, writing that despite Discordian claims that its 'catmas' are soft, optional beliefs,

Nevertheless, the Principia Discordia contains a complex and subtle religious system, although this is often obscured by its chaotic structure. The theology of the Principia is perhaps best summarized in the symbol [...] The Sacred Chao [...] Taken as a whole, however, the Sacred Chao symbolizes the Discordian idea that both order and chaos are man-made concepts, and that to believe that either is more 'true' than the other is illusion. The Sacred Chao represents 'pure chaos', the metaphysical grounding of all that is, and a level beyond any distinction-making.

== Other Discordian works ==
The Discordian movement encompasses a diverse array of works, both real and fictitious, that explore themes of chaos, satire, and alternative spirituality. These include Zen Without Zen Masters by Camden Benares, which presents koans and stories of a Discordian nature, and Zenarchy by Kerry Thornley, which proposes a non-combative approach to anarchy infused with Zen philosophy. Natural Law, or Don't Put a Rubber on Your Willy by Robert Anton Wilson delves into themes of personal freedom and self-awareness, expanding upon Wilson's essay originally published in 1985. In addition, there are compilations such as Apocrypha Discordia and Historia Discordia, which gather diverse materials from the Discordian tradition, including writings by both original and contemporary Discordians.

Several works also explore the lives of key figures within Discordianism, such as The Prankster and the Conspiracy by Adam Gorightly, which focuses on Kerry Thornley's interactions with countercultural figures like Lee Harvey Oswald. Chasing Eris by Brenton Clutterbuck provides an in-depth examination of Discordianism's impact on various aspects of culture and society, offering interviews and insights into the movement's global reach and influence. It also includes an interpretation of the Principia Discordia chapter "The Parable of The Bitter Tea" by its original author.

== See also ==
- Immanentize the eschaton
