= The Illuminatus! Trilogy =

Series of novels by Robert Shea and Robert Anton Wilson

- First collected edition, 1984
- Authors: Robert Shea; Robert Anton Wilson
- Cover artist: Carlos Victor Ochagavia (1975 paperbacks)
- Language: English
- Genre: satire, science fiction
- Publisher: Dell Publishing
- Publication date: 1975 (individual volumes); 1984 (collected edition)
- Publication place: United States
- Media type: Print (hardback & paperback)
- Pages: 805 pages (paperback collected edition)
- ISBN: 1-56731-237-3 (hardback collected edition), ISBN 1-85487-574-4 (paperback collected edition)
- OCLC: 39505921

The Illuminatus! Trilogy is a series of three novels by American writers Robert Shea and Robert Anton Wilson, first published in 1975. The trilogy is a satirical, postmodern, science fiction–influenced adventure story; a drug-, sex-, and magic-laden trek through a number of conspiracy theories, both historical and imaginary, related to the authors' version of the Illuminati. The narrative often switches between third- and first-person perspectives in a nonlinear narrative. It is thematically dense, covering topics like counterculture, numerology, and Discordianism.

The trilogy comprises three parts which contain five books and appendices: The Eye in the Pyramid (first two books), The Golden Apple (third and part of fourth book), Leviathan (part of fourth and all of fifth book, and the appendices). The parts were first published as three separate volumes starting in September 1975. In 1984 they were published as an omnibus edition and are now more commonly reprinted in the latter form. In 1986 the trilogy won the Prometheus Hall of Fame Award. The authors further dealt with its themes in fiction and non-fiction works.

Illuminatus! has been adapted for the stage and as an audio book, and has influenced several modern writers, artists, musicians, and game-makers. The popularity of the word "fnord" and the 23 enigma can both be attributed to the trilogy.

== Narrative ==
The plot meanders between the thoughts, hallucinations and inner voices, real and imagined, of its many characters—ranging from a squirrel to a New York City detective to an artificial intelligence—as well as through time (past, present, and future), and sometimes in mid-sentence. Much of the back story is explained via dialogue between characters, who recount unreliable, often mutually contradictory, versions of their supposed histories. There are even parts in the book in which the narrative reviews and jokingly deconstructs the work itself.

=== Plot summary ===
The trilogy's story begins with an investigation by two New York City police detectives (Saul Goodman and Barney Muldoon) into the bombing of Confrontation, a leftist magazine, and the disappearance of its editor, Joe Malik. Discovering the magazine's investigation into the assassinations of John F. Kennedy, Robert F. Kennedy, and Martin Luther King Jr., the two follow a trail of memos that suggest the involvement of powerful secret societies. They slowly become drawn into a web of conspiracy theories. Meanwhile, the magazine's reporter, George Dorn—having been turned loose without support deep in right-wing Mad Dog, Texas—is arrested for drug possession. He is jailed and physically threatened, at one point hallucinating about his own execution. The prison is bombed and he is rescued by the Discordians, led by the enigmatic Hagbard Celine, captain of a golden submarine. Hagbard represents the Discordians in their eternal battle against the Illuminati, the conspiratorial organization that secretly controls the world. He finances his operations by smuggling illicit substances.

The plot meanders around the globe to such locations as Las Vegas (where an epidemic of deadly mutated anthrax secretly developed by the U.S. government has been accidentally unleashed); Atlantis (where Howard, the talking porpoise, and his porpoise aides help Hagbard battle the Illuminati); Chicago (where someone resembling John Dillinger was killed many years ago); and to the island of Fernando Poo (the location of the next great Cold War standoff between the Soviet Union, China, and the United States).

The evil scheme uncovered late in the tale is an attempt to immanentize the eschaton, a secret scheme of the American Medical Association, an evil rock band, to bring about a mass human sacrifice, the purpose of which is the release of enough "life-energy" to give eternal life to a select group of initiates, including Adolf Hitler. The AMA are revealed to be four siblings (last name Saure) who comprise four of the five mysterious Illuminati Primi. The identity of the fifth remains unknown for much of the trilogy. The first European "Woodstock" festival, held at Ingolstadt, Bavaria (place of origin of the real historical Illuminati), is the chosen location for the sacrifice of the unwary victims, via the reawakening of hibernating Nazi battalions from the bottom of nearby (fictitious) Lake Totenkopf (a literal translation of contemporary American English "dead head"). The plot is foiled when, with the help of a 50-foot-tall incarnation of the goddess Eris, the four members of the AMA are killed: Wilhelm is killed by the monstrous alien being Yog-Sothoth, Wolfgang is shot by John Dillinger, Winifred is drowned by porpoises, and Werner is trapped in a sinking car.

The major protagonists, now gathered together on board the submarine, are menaced by the Leviathan, a giant, pyramid-shaped single-cell sea monster that has been growing in size for hundreds of millions of years. The over-the-top nature of this encounter leads some of the characters to question whether they are merely characters in a book. This metafictional note is swiftly rejected (or ignored) as they turn their attention to the monster again. The threat is neutralized by offering up their onboard computer as something for the creature to communicate with to ease its loneliness. Finally Hagbard manages to defeat the Illuminati Primi and travels to Alpha Centauri in 1999.

=== Characters ===
- Carmel – a pimp living in Las Vegas
- Freeman Hagbard Celine – leader of the Discordians and a central protagonist in The Illuminatus! Trilogy
- George Dorn – reporter for Confrontation
- Saul Goodman – New York City detective
- Rebecca Murphy Goodman – Saul Goodman's wife
- Howard – a porpoise
- Joe Malik – editor of Confrontation
- Mao Tsu-Hsi – Illuminati recruiter
- Simon Moon – anarchist
- Barney Muldoon – New York City detective
- Tarantella Serpentine – an Illuminati-trained prostitute
- Markoff Chaney – a little person on a cross country mission to spread chaos
- Fission Chips – a British secret agent
- Harry Coin – a perverted assassin
- Robert Putney Drake – a mob boss obsessed with the occult

== Titles ==
The titles of the three volumes or parts (the front covers were titled Illuminatus! Part I The Eye in the Pyramid, Illuminatus! Part II The Golden Apple and Illuminatus! Part III Leviathan) refer to recurring symbols of elements of the plot.

The Eye in the Pyramid refers to the Eye of Providence, which in the novel represents particularly the Bavarian Illuminati, and makes a number of appearances (for example, as an altar and a tattoo).

The Golden Apple refers to the golden apple of discord, from the Greek myth of the Judgement of Paris. In the trilogy it is used as the symbol of the Legion of Dynamic Discord, a Discordian group; the golden apple makes a number of appearances, for example, on the cover, on a black flag, and as an emblem on a uniform.

Leviathan refers to the Biblical sea monster Leviathan, which is a potential danger to Hagbard's submarine Leif Erickson (from the name of the Icelandic discoverer of America). It also refers to Thomas Hobbes' seminal work of political philosophy, Leviathan, as a metaphor for an all-encompassing, authoritarian state – a common metaphor used in libertarian discourse.

== Publishing history ==
The trilogy was originally written between 1969 and 1971 while Wilson and Shea were both associate editors for Playboy magazine. As part of the role, they dealt with correspondence from the general public on the subject of civil liberties, much of which involved paranoid rants about imagined conspiracies. The pair began to write a novel with the premise that "all these nuts are right, and every single conspiracy they complain about really exists". In a 1980 interview given to the science fiction magazine Starship, Wilson suggested the novel was also an attempt to build a myth around Discordianism:

It started with the Discordian Society, which is based on worship of Eris, the Greek goddess of confusion and chaos [...] We felt the Society needed some opposition, because the whole idea of it is based on conflict and dialectics. So, we created an opposition within the Discordian Society, which we called the Bavarian Illuminati [...] There were several Discordian newsletters written in the 1960s, and several Discordian members wrote for the underground press in various parts of the country. So, we built up this myth about the warfare between the Discordian Society and the Illuminati for quite a while, until one day Bob Shea said to me, "You know, we could write a novel about this!"

There was no specific division of labor in the collaborative writing process, although Shea's writing tended towards melodrama, while Wilson's parts tended towards satire. Wilson states in a 1976 interview conducted by Neal Wilgus:

In general, the melodrama is Shea and the satire is me; but some of the satire is definitely him and some of the melodrama is certainly me. "When Atlantis Ruled the Earth" is 99% Shea. The sections about Simon Moon, Robert Putney Drake and Markoff Chaney are 99% me. Everything else is impossible to untangle.

According to Ken Campbell, who created a stage adaptation of Illuminatus! with Chris Langham, the writing process was treated as a game of one-upmanship between the two co-authors, and was an enjoyable experience for both:

They had a lot of access to research staff. And so under the guise that it would be helpful writing articles for Playboy (I don't think it was really) they got into the Illuminati. Wilson would bung these memos to Shea as material came in from the researchers—like the memos in the book. When they got to memo 23, Shea said, "If we imagine a New York cop came across these memos, I think we've got the basis for a fine thriller!" So the next one Wilson wrote was episode one of the thriller. Shea replied with episode two. They were playing a game really. Like, I bet you can't continue this! The answer is, "No I can't, so we'll continue with this!"

The unusual end product did not appeal to publishers, and it took several years before anybody agreed to take it on. According to Wilson, the division of Illuminatus! into three parts was a commercial decision of the publisher, not the authors, who had conceived it as a single continuous volume. Shea and Wilson were required to cut 500 pages to reduce printing costs on what was seen as a risky venture, although Wilson states that most of the ideas contained therein made it into his later works. The idea that the top secrets of the Illuminati were cut from the books because the printer decided to trim the number of pages is a joke typical of the trilogy.

Dell Publishing first released these individual editions (with covers illustrated by Carlos Victor Ochagavia) in the United States in 1975, to favorable reviews and some commercial success. It became a cult favorite but did not cross over into large mainstream sales. In Britain, Sphere Books released the individual editions (with different cover art by Tony Roberts) in 1976. The individual editions sold steadily until 1984, when the trilogy was republished in a single omnibus volume for the first time. This collected edition lost the "what has gone before" introduction to The Golden Apple and the "Prologue" to Leviathan. Some of the material in that foreword, such as the self-destruct mynah birds (taught to say "Here, kitty-kitty-kitty!"), appears nowhere else in the trilogy, likely a result of the 500 pages of cuts demanded by Dell. The omnibus edition gave a new lease on life to flagging sales, and became the most commonly available form of the trilogy from then on.

The trilogy was translated and published in German, again both as separate volumes (the three covers of which formed a triptych) and an omnibus. The face of J. R. "Bob" Dobbs was split across the first two volumes, despite the Church of the SubGenius not being featured in the novel (although Wilson had become a member). The Church was founded by Illuminatus! fans, and the image of "Bob" is widely considered to be a representation of Wilson himself.

== Themes ==
The Illuminatus! Trilogy covers a wide range of subjects throughout the book. These include discussions about mythology, current events, conspiracy theories and counterculture.

=== Conspiracies ===
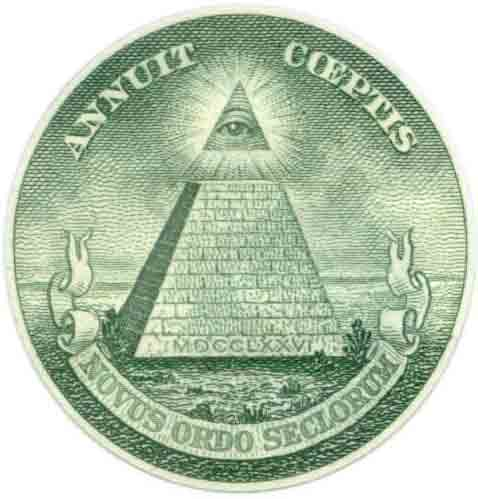
The Eye in the Pyramid as represented by the Great Seal of the United States on a dollar bill

Although the many conspiracy theories in the book are imaginary, these are mixed in with enough truth to make them seem plausible. For example, the title of the first book, The Eye in the Pyramid, refers to the Eye of Providence, a mystical symbol which derives from the ancient Egyptian Eye of Horus and is erroneously claimed to be the symbol of the Bavarian Illuminati. Some of America's founding fathers are alleged by conspiracy theorists to have been members of this sect.

The books are loaded with references to the Illuminati, the Argenteum Astrum, many and various world domination plans, conspiracy theories and pieces of gnostic knowledge. Many of the odder conspiracies in the book are taken from unpublished letters to Playboy magazine, where the authors were working as associate editors while they wrote the novels. Among the oddest was the suggestion that Adam Weishaupt, founder of the Bavarian Illuminati, killed George Washington and took on his identity as President of the United States. This is often noted in Illuminati-conspiracy discussion.

=== Fnord ===
The nonsense word fnord, invented by the writers of Principia Discordia, is given a specific and sinister meaning in the trilogy. It is a subliminal message technique, a word that the majority of the population since early childhood has been trained to ignore (and trained to forget both the training and that they are ignoring it), but which they associate with a vague sense of unease. Upon seeing the word, readers experience a panic reaction. They then subconsciously suppress all memories of having seen the word, but the sense of panic remains. They therefore associate the unease with the news story they are reading. Fnords are scattered liberally in the text of newspapers and magazines, causing fear and anxiety in those following current events. There are no fnords in the advertisements, thus encouraging a consumerist society. Fnord magazine equated the fnords with a generalized effort to control and brainwash the populace. To "see the fnords" would imply an attempt to wrestle back individual autonomy, similar to the idea of reading between the lines, especially since the word fnord was actually said to appear between regular lines of text.

The word makes its first appearance in The Illuminatus! Trilogy without any explanation during an acid trip by Dr. Ignotum Per Ignotius and Joe Malik: "The only good fnord is a dead fnord". Several other unexplained appearances follow. Only much later in the story is the secret revealed, when Malik is hypnotized by Hagbard Celine to recall suppressed memories of his first-grade teacher conditioning his class to ignore the fnords: "If you don't see the fnord it can't eat you, don't see the fnord, don't see the fnord..."

=== Numerology ===
Numerology is given great credence by many of the characters, with the Law of Fives in particular being frequently mentioned. Hagbard Celine states the Law of Fives in Appendix Gimmel: "All phenomena are directly or indirectly related to the number five." He gives away the secret when he adds, "given enough ingenuity on the part of the demonstrator. That's the very model of what a scientific law must always be: a statement about how the human mind relates to the cosmos." (Late in the work, Celine demonstrates the meaninglessness of the Law of Fives by showing another character a picture of a young girl with six fingers on each hand and saying, "If we were all like her, there'd be a Law of Sixes.") Another character, Simon Moon, identifies what he calls the "23 synchronicity principle", which he credits William S. Burroughs as having discovered. Both laws involve finding significance in the appearance of the number, and in its "presen[ce] esoterically because of its conspicuous exoteric absence." One of the reasons Moon finds 23 significant is because "All the great anarchists died on the 23rd day of some month or other." He also identifies a "23/17 phenomenon." They are both tied to the Law of Fives, he explains, because 2 + 3 = 5, and 1 + 7 = 8 = 2³. Robert Anton Wilson claimed in a 1988 interview that "23 is a part of the cosmic code. It's connected with so many synchronicities and weird coincidences that it must mean something, I just haven't figured out yet what it means!".

=== Counterculture ===
The books were written at the height of the late 1960s, and are infused with the popular counterculture ideas of that time. For instance, the New Age slogan "flower power" is referenced via its German form, Ewige Blumenkraft (literally "eternal flower power"), described by Shea and Wilson as a slogan of the Illuminati, the enemies of the hippie ideal. The book's attitude to New Age philosophies and beliefs are ambiguous. Wilson explained in a later interview: "I'm some kind of antibody in the New Age movement. on the rewrite we deliberately threw in a couple of references to it, but we had worked out the structure on our own, mostly on the basis of the nut mail that Playboy gets".

=== Cognitive dissonance ===
Every view of reality that is introduced in the story is later derided in some way, whether that view is traditional or iconoclastic. The trilogy is an exercise in cognitive dissonance, with an absurdist plot built of seemingly plausible, if unprovable, components. Ultimately, readers are left to form their own interpretations as to which, if any, of the numerous contradictory viewpoints presented by the characters are valid or plausible, and which are simply satirical gags and shaggy dog jokes. This style of building up a viable belief system, then tearing it down to replace it with another one, was described by Wilson as "guerrilla ontology".

=== Self-reference ===
There are several parts in the book where it reviews and jokingly deconstructs itself. The fictional journalist Epicene Wildeblood at one point is required to critique a book uncannily similar to The Illuminatus! Trilogy:

It's a dreadfully long monster of a book, [...] and I certainly won't have time to read it, but I'm giving it a thorough skimming. The authors are utterly incompetent—no sense of style or structure at all. It starts out as a detective story, switches to science-fiction, then goes off into the supernatural, and is full of the most detailed information of dozens of ghastly boring subjects. And the time sequence is all out of order in a very pretentious imitation of Faulkner and Joyce. Worst yet, it has the most raunchy sex scenes, thrown in just to make it sell, I'm sure, and the authors—whom I've never heard of—have the supreme bad taste to introduce real political figures into this mishmash and pretend to be exposing a real conspiracy. You can be sure I won't waste time reading such rubbish.

Several protagonists come to the realization that they are merely fictional characters, or at least begin to question the reality of their situation. George Dorn wonders early on if he "was in some crazy surrealist movie, wandering from telepathic sheriffs to homosexual assassins, to nympho lady Masons, to psychotic pirates, according to a script written in advance by two acid-heads and a Martian humorist". Hagbard Celine claims towards the climax that the entire story is a computer-generated synthesis of random conspiracies: "I can fool the rest of you, but I can't fool the reader. FUCKUP has been working all morning, correlating all the data on this caper and its historical roots, and I programmed him to put it in the form of a novel for easy reading. Considering what a lousy job he does at poetry, I suppose it will be a high-camp novel, intentionally or unintentionally."

=== Allusions to other works ===
The novel Telemachus Sneezed by the character Atlanta Hope with its catchphrase "What is John Guilt?" is a spoof of Ayn Rand's Atlas Shrugged, the origin of the character John Galt. Ayn Rand is mentioned by name a few times in Illuminatus!, and her novel is alluded to by Hagbard who says, "If Atlas can Shrug and Telemachus can Sneeze, why can't Satan Repent?" Rand is also disparaged in one of the appendices concerning property, ostensibly written by Hagbard, which serves as an explanation of anarchist Pierre-Joseph Proudhon's views on the subject. There are also references to Thomas Pynchon's The Crying of Lot 49 and his Gravity's Rainbow, an equally enormous experimental novel concerning liberty and paranoia that was published two years prior to Illuminatus! Wilson claims his book was already complete by the time he and Shea read Pynchon's novel (which went on to win several awards), but they then went back and made some modifications to the text before its final publication to allude to Pynchon's work.

== Reviews and reputation ==
The books have received laudatory reviews and comments from Playboy, Publishers Weekly, the American Library Association's Booklist magazine, Philadelphia Daily News, Berkeley Barb, Rolling Stone and Limit. The Village Voice called it "The ultimate conspiracy book ... the biggest sci-fi-cult novel to come along since Dune ... hilariously raunchy!" John White of the New Age Journal described it as:

An epic fantasy...a devilishly funny work ... shimmers with illusion and paradox that provides delight after magical delight ... a farcical black tragicomedy that turns out to have been written by you and me ... it strips away illusion.

The Fortean Times was also enthusiastic, whilst acknowledging the difficulties many readers would have attempting to follow the convoluted plot threads:

Be prepared for streams of consciousness in which not only identity but time and space no longer confine the narrative, which zips up and down time-lines and flashes into other minds with consummate ease [...] A damned good read. Has to be read to be believed (and even then I'm not sure—it really is preposterous in parts).

Illuminatus! even garnered some attention outside literary criticism, having several pages devoted to it in a chapter on the American New Right in Architects of Fear: Conspiracy Theories and Paranoia in American Politics by George Johnson (1983).

In more recent years, it was complimented in the bibliography to the New Hackers Dictionary as a book that can help readers "understand the hacker mindset." The Dictionary described it as:

An incredible berserko-surrealist rollercoaster of world-girdling conspiracies, intelligent dolphins, the fall of Atlantis, who really killed JFK, sex, drugs, rock'n'roll, and the Cosmic Giggle Factor. [...] The perfect right-brain companion to Hofstadter's Gödel, Escher, Bach.

It was also included in the "Slack Syllabus" in The Official Slacker Handbook by Sarah Dunn (1994), a satirical guide aimed at Generation X.

== Follow-ups ==
Wilson and Robert Shea went on to become prolific authors. While Shea concentrated mainly on historical novels, Wilson produced over 30 works, mixing fictional novels with nonfiction. Although both authors' later work often elaborated on concepts first discussed in Illuminatus!, the pair never collaborated again. The trilogy inspired a number of direct adaptations, including a stage play and a comic book series, and numerous indirect adaptations that borrowed from its themes.

=== Shea and Wilson ===
Wilson subsequently wrote a number of prequels, sequels and spin-offs based upon the Illuminatus! concept, including an incomplete pentalogy called The Historical Illuminatus Chronicles, a standalone work entitled Masks of the Illuminati and The Illuminati Papers, in which several chapters are attributed to the trilogy's characters. Many of Wilson's other works, fictional and nonfictional, also make reference to the Illuminati or the Illuminatus! books. Several of the characters from Illuminatus!, for example, Markoff Chaney ("The Midget") and Epicene Wildeblood, return in Wilson's Schrödinger's Cat Trilogy, which also carries on some of its themes. The third book of the Cat trilogy, The Homing Pigeons, is actually mentioned as a sequel to Illuminatus! in "Appendix Mem". In 1998, Wilson published an encyclopedia of conspiracy theories called Everything is Under Control, which explains the origins of many of the theories mentioned in Illuminatus!.

Wilson and Shea planned to recollaborate on a true sequel, Bride of Illuminatus, taking place in 2026. It was rumored that it would feature a resurrected Winifred Saure (the only female member of the American Medical Association) exerting her influence through virtual reality. Shea died in 1994 before this project came to fruition. An excerpt was published in Robert Anton Wilson's Trajectories Newsletter: The Journal of Futurism and Heresy in spring 1995. In a 1994 interview for FringeWare Review, Wilson suggested he may even "do a Son of Illuminatus later". In Intelligence Agents by Timothy Leary (1996) he was credited with having already authored Son of Illuminatus in the 1980s.

Shea never wrote another Illuminatus!-related book, although many of his later novels include references to the themes of that work. Locus called his Saracen novels "deep background for the Illuminatus trilogy".

=== Adaptations ===
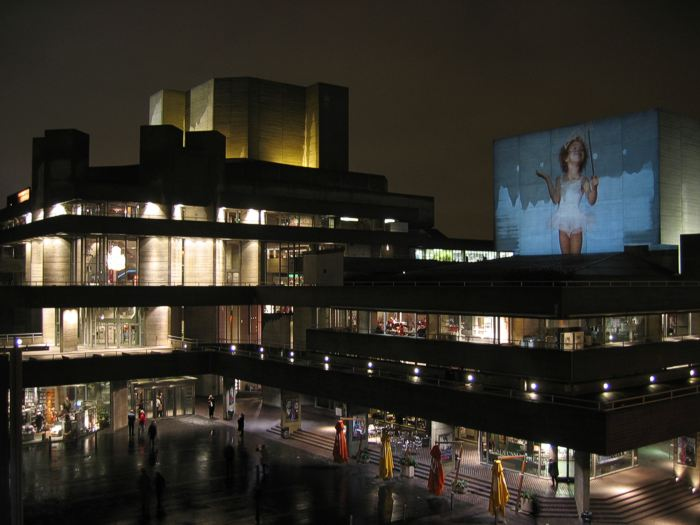
London's National Theatre, seen from Waterloo Bridge

An audacious proposal by the English experimental theater director Ken Campbell to stage Illuminatus! in its entirety at The National Theatre in London was met with surprisingly open arms, particularly given its inordinate length: a cycle of five plays—The Eye of the Pyramid, Swift Kick Inc., The Man Who Murdered God, Walpurgisnacht Rock and Leviathan—each consisting of five 23-minute acts. Sir Peter Hall, director of the National at the time, wrote of Campbell in his Diaries, "He is a total anarchist and impossible to pin down. He more or less said it was a crime to be serious."

The adaptation became the very first production at the National's Cottesloe Theatre space, running from 4 March to 27 March 1977. It had first opened in Liverpool on 23 November 1976. The first night of the London version featured Robert Anton Wilson, accompanied by Shea, as a naked extra in the witches' sabbat scene. Wilson was delighted with the adaptation, saying: "I was thunderstruck at what a magnificent job they did in capturing the exact tone and mixture of fantasy and reality in the book. I've come to the conclusion that this isn't literature. It's too late in the day for literature. This is magic!"

The 23-strong cast featured several actors, such as Jim Broadbent, David Rappaport and Chris Langham, who went on to successful film, stage and television careers. Broadbent alone played more than a dozen characters in the play. Bill Drummond designed sets for the show, and it was eventually seen (when it moved to London, with Bill Nighy then joining the cast) by the young Jimmy Cauty. Drummond and Cauty went on to form the Illuminatus!-inspired electronica band The KLF.

In thanks, Wilson dedicated his Cosmic Trigger I: The Final Secret of the Illuminati (1977) to "Ken Campbell and the Science-Fiction Theatre Of Liverpool, England." The play was later staged in Seattle, Washington in 1978.

No film or video exists of the performances at The National Theatre. A full audio recording is available as a limited edition perk in the crowdfunding for the 2014 stage play of Wilson's book Cosmic Trigger I: The Final Secret of the Illuminati, adapted by Daisy Eris Campbell (Ken Campbell's daughter).

An attempt was made to adapt the trilogy in comic book form beginning in the 1980s, by "Eye-n-Apple Productions" headed by Icarus! Icarus! met with Wilson in 1984 and subsequently obtained permission from Wilson's agent to adapt the trilogy. Illuminatus! #1 was issued in July 1987, then reissued in substantially revised form later that year by Rip Off Press (who had published the original 4th edition of the Principia Discordia in 1970).

A second issue followed in 1990, and a third in March 1991, after which the venture stalled (although several ashcans of the as yet unpublished Fourth Trip were distributed at comic book conventions in the Detroit and Chicago areas between 1991 and 2006).

A new comic book adaptation was launched in 2024, Tales of Illuminatus!, with two issues released so far and a third coming in the Summer of 2026.

=== Influence ===
The 1980s computer hacker Karl Koch was heavily influenced by The Illuminatus! Trilogy. Besides adopting the pseudonym "Hagbard" from the character Hagbard Celine, he also named his computer "FUCKUP", after a computer designed and built by that character. He was addicted to cocaine and became extremely paranoid, convinced he was fighting the Illuminati like his literary namesake. In 1987 he wrote a rambling seven-page "hacking manifesto of sorts, complete with his theories on Hagbard Celine and the Illuminati". The 1998 German motion picture 23 told a dramatized version of his story; Robert Anton Wilson appeared as himself.

A card game, Illuminati, inspired by the trilogy, was created by Steve Jackson Games. Using the Illuminatus! books as "spiritual guides but not as actual source material", it incorporated competing conspiracies of the Bavarian Illuminati and Discordians and others, though no characters or groups specific to the novels. A trading card game (Illuminati: New World Order) and role-playing game supplement (GURPS Illuminati) followed. The instruction booklets' bibliographies praise the novel and Wilson particularly, calling Illuminatus! in part "required reading for any conspiracy buff". Robert Shea provided a four-paragraph introduction to the rulebook for the Illuminati Expansion Set 1 (1983), in which he wrote, "Maybe the Illuminati are behind this game. They must be—they are, by definition, behind everything." Despite this initial involvement, Wilson later criticized some of these products for exploiting the Illuminatus! name without paying royalties (taking advantage of what he viewed as a legal loophole).

The Illuminatus! Trilogy is steeped with references to the 1960s popular music scene (at one point a list of 200 fictional bands performing at the Walpurgisnacht rock festival is reeled off (including a handful of actual bands of the '60s), and there are numerous references to the famous rock and roll song "Rock Around the Clock"), and has influenced many bands and musicians. One of the aliases of anarchic British band The KLF was named after a secret society from the trilogy. They released much of their early material under the name "The Justified Ancients of Mu Mu"/"The JAMMs", cf. "The Justified Ancients of Mummu"/"The JAMs" from the trilogy, and much of their work was Discordian in nature. They mirrored the fictional JAMs' gleeful political tactics of causing chaos and confusion by bringing a direct, humorous but nevertheless revolutionary approach to making records. The American band Machines of Loving Grace took the name of a sex act performed by one of the main characters during a Black Mass for the title of their song "Rite of Shiva" on their eponymous album. UK chillout maestro Mixmaster Morris also named his band The Irresistible Force after one that appears at the festival in the last part of the trilogy. Together with Coldcut he organised a huge Robert Anton Wilson Memorial Show at the Queen Elizabeth Hall in London on 18 March 2007.

In general, The Illuminatus! Trilogy can be credited with popularizing the genre of conspiracy fiction, a field later mined by authors like Umberto Eco (Foucault's Pendulum), Charles Cecil (Broken Sword: The Shadow of the Templars) and Dan Brown (Angels & Demons, The Da Vinci Code, The Lost Symbol), comic book writers like Alan Moore (V for Vendetta, From Hell), Dave Sim (Cerebus) and Grant Morrison (The Invisibles), and screenwriters like Chris Carter (The X-Files) and Damon Lindelof (Lost). In particular, the regular use of the Illuminati in popular culture as shadowy central puppet masters in this type of fiction can be traced back to their exposure via The Illuminatus! Trilogy.

== Editions ==
Major English-language editions include:

- 1975, US, Dell, Separate editions, The Eye in the Pyramid ISBN 0-440-04688-2, The Golden Apple ISBN 0-440-04691-2 Leviathan ISBN 0-440-14742-5
- 1976–77, UK, Sphere, Separate editions, The Eye in the Pyramid ISBN 0-7221-9208-8, The Golden Apple ISBN 0-7221-9209-6 Leviathan ISBN 0-7221-9211-8
- 1980, US, Laurel, Separate editions, The Eye in the Pyramid ISBN 0-440-34688-6, The Golden Apple ISBN 0-7221-9209-6, Leviathan ISBN 0-440-34742-4
- 1984, US, Dell ISBN 0-440-53981-1, Paperback (collected edition)
- 1986, UK, Sphere, Paperback (separate editions), The Eye in the Pyramid ISBN 0-7221-9219-3 The Golden Apple ISBN 0-7221-9222-3 Leviathan ISBN 0-7221-9216-9
- 1988, US, Bantam Doubleday Dell Publishing Group ISBN 0-440-53981-1, Paperback (collected edition)
- 1998, US, MJF Books ISBN 1-56731-237-3, Hardback (collected edition)
- 1998, US, Constable and Robinson ISBN 1-85487-574-4, Paperback (collected edition)

== See also ==
- Celine's laws
- List of underwater science fiction works
