= Social Suicide (album) =

Studio album by Bomb Factory
- Released: November 15, 2006
- Genre: Hard rock Punk rock Hardcore punk
- Length: 38:03
- Label: Sea Green/Toshiba EMI
- Producer: Bomb Factory

Bomb Factory chronology
Slickdrive (single) (2006)	Social Suicide (2006)	Greatest Hits (2007)

Social Suicide is the fifth full-length album by punk rock band Bomb Factory. It was released in November 2006 on Sea Green/Toshiba EMI, and contains 11 songs.

== Track listing ==
All tracks are written by Bomb Factory.

No.	Title	Length
1.	"Viper"	3:08
2.	"Slickdrive"	3:36
3.	"Frog Said..."	3:08
4.	"Distraction"	3:36
5.	"Automatic Kiss"	3:43
6.	"So Long"	3:58
7.	"Way"	2:29
8.	"Drunk & Broke"	3:21
9.	"Sick Head"	3:01
10.	"White Road"	3:42
11.	"Madplan (Acoustic)"	4:21
