= N2O Records =

- Founded: 1997
- Genre: Punk rock; drum'n'bass; breakcore; jungle; hip hop; reggae
- Country of origin: U.S.
- Location: Los Angeles, California
- Official website: www.n2orecords.com

N2O Records (Nitrous Oxide Entertainment) was founded in 1997 with the first DJ compilation Home Invasion Vol. 1 CD/LP of Los Angeles DJs that produce harder sounding electronic, drum and bass, breakbeat and hardcore techno. The label has managed to re-invent itself from a jungle/drum and bass/turntablism focused label into a rock and remix label.

Among the highlighted releases of N2O Records is the debut solo album of Sid Wilson (Slipknot), #0, DJ Starscream's The New Leader CD/LP and Omar Rodríguez-López's solo album Calibration (lead guitarist of The Mars Volta, At the Drive-In, De Facto). Calibration was Omar's second album to chart on a Billboard music chart and his highest charting yet, peaking at number 29 on the Top Heatseekers chart.

The label updated their name to Charged N2O Records in 2006 and has become the U.S. promotional arm of the Japanese band The Boom Boom Satellites of Sony Music/gr8 Records. N2O has become the label of release for experimental indie side projects and solo endeavors for some major label mainstream musicians, producers, and individual band members.

As of December 2009, the label catalog has reached over 250 titles in 12 years for U.S. and Japan-only releases of 12" vinyl, 7" vinyl, 10" vinyl, cassette, CD and digital formats.

N2O Records are exclusively distributed by The Orchard (U.S.A.), and Entertainment One Canada, UV in Japan, and Cargo in the United Kingdom and Europe. N2O Record's recent releases are focused on Japanese hip hop pioneer DJ Baku and loud rock veterans Uzumaki, Future Dub, General Malice, and Bomb Factory.
