= Discordianism =

Belief system based around the Greek goddess Eris

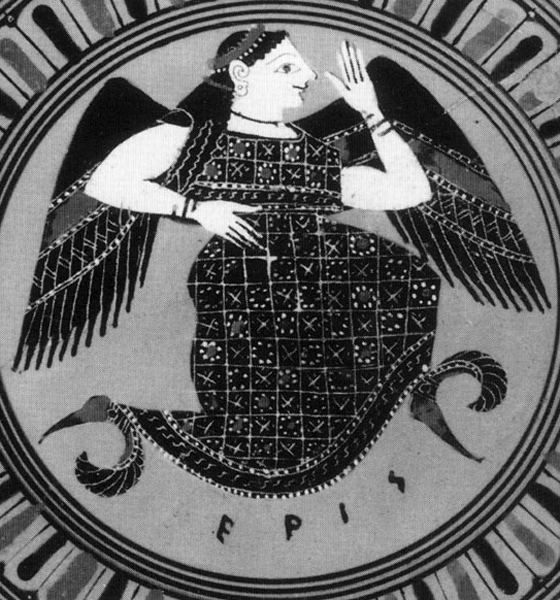
- Eris, the Greek goddess of discord
- Type: New religious movement
- Classification: Virtual religion
- Scripture: Principia Discordia
- Language: English
- Founder: Malaclypse the Younger and Omar Khayyam Ravenhurst
- Origin: 1960s United States

Discordianism is a belief system based around Eris, the Greek goddess of strife and discord, and variously defined as a religion, new religious movement, virtual religion, or somewhere between parody and social commentary. It was founded after the 1963 publication of its holy book, Principia Discordia, written by Greg Hill with Kerry Wendell Thornley, the two working under the pseudonyms Malaclypse the Younger and Omar Khayyam Ravenhurst.

David Chidester considers Discordianism to be the first virtual religion and the first to take up the challenge of establishing its religious authenticity. When the Yahoo search engine categorized Discordianism as a parody religion, in May 2001 Discordians started an email campaign to get the religion reclassified. It is difficult to estimate the number of Discordians because they are not required to hold Discordianism as their only belief system.

According to Arthur Versluis, Discordianism "both shaped and reflects the counterculture of the 1960s and 1970s".

== Founding and structure ==
The foundational document of Discordianism is Principia Discordia, fourth edition (1970), written by Malaclypse the Younger, an alias of Gregory Hill. Principia Discordia often hints that Discordianism was founded as a dialectic antithesis to more popular religions based on order, although the rhetoric throughout the book describes chaos as a much more underlying impulse of the universe. This may have been done with the intention of merely "balancing out" the creative forces of order and disorder, but the focus is on the more disorderly aspects of the world — at times the forces of order are even vilified. Disharmony is particularly emphasized, along with its relation to harmony.

=== Organizations ===
==== Discordian Society ====
The most general group, presumably including all Discordians (and potentially others), is the Discordian Society, whose definition is nonexistent. Its members include many adherents of Neopaganism and Thelema.

==== POEE ====
The sect of Discordianism founded by Malaclypse the Younger and Omar Khayyam Ravenhurst is known as the Paratheo-Anametamystikhood of Eris Esoteric (POEE), a non-prophet irreligious disorganisation. Principia Discordia contains some details about the structure of POEE. In particular:

POEE has 5 DEGREES:
There is the neophyte, or LEGIONNAIRE DISCIPLE.
The LEGIONNAIRE DEACON, who is catching on.
An Ordained POEE PRIEST/PRIESTESS or a CHAPLAIN.
The HIGH PRIEST, the Polyfather.
And POEE POPE.

POEE LEGIONNAIRE DISCIPLES are authorized to initiate others as Discordian Society Legionnaires. PRIESTS appoint their own DEACONS. The POLYFATHER ordains Priests. I don't know about the POPES.

=== Episkopos ===
Episkoposes are the overseers of sects of Discordianism which they have created, such as Robert Anton Wilson. They speak to Eris through the use of their pineal gland. It is said in Principia Discordia that Eris says different things to each listener. She may even say radically different things to each Episkopos, but all of what she says is equally her word (even if it contradicts another iteration of her word).

=== Popes ===
According to Principia Discordia, "every single man, woman, and child on this Earth" is a pope. Included in Principia Discordia is an official Pope card that may be reproduced and distributed freely to anyone and everyone.

=== Saints ===
There are five classes of saints within Discordianism, who are those who best act as exemplars and are closer to perfection. Only the first of these classes, "Saint Second Class", contains real human beings (deceased and alive), with higher classes reserved for fictional beings who, by virtue of being fictional, are better able to reach the Discordian view of perfection.

An example of a second-class saint is Emperor Norton, a citizen in 19th-century San Francisco, who despite suffering delusions was beloved by much of the city. He is honoured as a saint within Discordianism for living his life according to truth as he saw it and a disregard for reality as others would perceive it.

=== Other ===
Since the first edition, various approaches to a Discordian organization chart – called in the work is "disorganization" and later "disorganizational matrix" – have differed from volume to volume, but have included especially the House of the Apostles of Eris, which is inclusive of the founders as the Apostles, of the Golden Apple Corps and Holders of the Sacred Chao, of the priesthood and saints, of the episkoposes, and even of "heretical" or "protestant" internal opponents of some of these, but not inclusive of the popes, legionnaires, disciples, and various other parties. A variety of other notional organizations were renamed and shuffled around and often enough replaced, as part of POEE (which did not appear in the first edition). But the House of the Apostles of Eris continued to be credited as the sanctioning body of the later editions, and remained the top division of the POEE "Eristocracy".

Another recurrent organizational name is the Legion of Dynamic Discord, inclusive of legionnaires, disciples, and evangelists. LODD was also introduced in the first edition and survived throughout later versions (as an element of POEE's House of the Rising Podge for the Disciples), as well as in works less centrally associated with Discordianism, such The Zenarchist's Cookbook which integrates some elements of Thornley's Zenarchy material and is dedicated (in an obfuscatory introduction) to the LODD.

== Mythology ==
=== Eris and Aneris and their brother Spirituality ===
In Discordian mythology, Aneris is described as the sister of Eris a.k.a. Discordia. Whereas Eris/Discordia is the goddess of disorder and being, Aneris/Harmonia is the goddess of order and non-being.

"DOGMA III – HISTORY 32, 'COSMOGONY'" in Principia Discordia, states:

In the beginning there was VOID, who had two daughters; one (the smaller) was that of BEING, named ERIS, and one (the larger) was of NON-BEING, named ANERIS.

The sterile Aneris becomes jealous of Eris (who was born pregnant), and starts making existent things non-existent. This explains why life begins, and later ends in death:

And to this day, things appear and disappear in this very manner.

However, the Void decrees that Aneris may not absorb her brother Spirituality, that he can only be absorbed back into the Void itself. Cusack points out that this is "distilled into a teaching about the ultimate fate of humans: 'so it shall be that non-existence shall take us back from existence and that nameless spirituality shall return to the Void, like a tired child home from a very wild circus.'"

=== Hand of Eris ===
The Discordian five-fingered hand symbol

The rotated symbol used for the dwarf planet Eris.

The "five-fingered hand of Eris" (shown at right) is one of several symbols used in Discordianism. It was adapted as an astronomical/astrological symbol for the dwarf planet Eris. Initially, the planetary symbol, designed by Discordian Denis Moskowitz, was rotated 90 degrees and had a cross-bar added so that it resembled two lunate epsilons (Є) back-to-back, with epsilon being the Greek initial of Eris. The cross-bar was later dropped, but the vertical orientation retained. The Hand of Eris has appeared in a public-outreach publication by NASA, though planetary symbols play only a minor role in modern astronomy.

The symbol was accepted by Unicode in 2016 as U+2BF0 ⯰ ERIS FORM ONE (⯰).

=== Original Snub ===
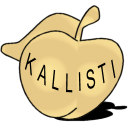
Apple of Discord

The "Original Snub" is the Discordian name for the events leading up to the judgement of Paris, although more focus is put on the actions of Eris. Zeus believes that Eris is a troublemaker, so he does not invite her to Peleus and Thetis's wedding. Having been snubbed, Eris creates a golden apple with the word kallisti (Ancient Greek: καλλίστῃ, 'for the prettiest') inscribed in it. This, the Apple of Discord, is a notable symbol in Discordianism and is included in the Sacred Chao. It is traditionally described as being made of gold. (Note: Whether that gold was metallic or Acapulco is noted as uncertain.)

=== Curse of Greyface ===
One of the most important parts of Discordianism, the Curse of Greyface features prominently on several pages of the Principia Discordia. According to Principia Discordia, Greyface was a man who lived in the year 1166 BC and taught that life is serious and play is sin. The curse is the psychological and spiritual imbalance that results from these beliefs, both individually and within groups, nations, and civilizations.

In addition to the generic advice of cultivating the natural love of chaos and playing with her, the Principia Discordia provides "The Turkey Curse Revealed by the Apostle Dr. Van Van Mojo" to counteract the Curse of Greyface. The Turkey Curse is designed to counteract destructive order. It derives its name from the fact that the incantation resembles the sounds of a turkey.

== Theology ==
=== Three core principles ===
The Principia Discordia holds three core principles: the Aneristic and Eristic principles representing order and disorder, and the notion that both are mere illusions.

=== The Pentabarf ===
The Pentabarf are five rules of Discordianism, described by David G. Robertson as "the Discordian take on the Ten Commandments". As venerators of Eris, Discordian views vary from one person to the next as neither order nor disorder, nor chaos are requisites of falling into the Discordian category. The fifth rule is representative of that.

I—There is no Goddess but Goddess and She is Your Goddess. There is no Erisian Movement but The Erisian Movement and it is The Erisian Movement. And every Golden Apple Corps is the beloved home of a Golden Worm.
II—A Discordian Shall Always use the Official Discordian Document Numbering System.
III—A Discordian is Required during his early Illumination to Go Off Alone & Partake Joyously of a Hot Dog on a Friday; this Devotive Ceremony to Remonstrate against the popular Paganisms of the Day: of Catholic Christendom (no meat on Friday), of Judaism (no meat of Pork), of Hindic Peoples (no meat of Beef), of Buddhists (no meat of animal), and of Discordians (No Hot Dog Buns).
IV—A Discordian shall Partake of No Hot Dog Buns, for Such was the Solace of Our Goddess when She was Confronted with The Original Snub.
V—A Discordian is Prohibited of Believing What he Reads.

— Principia Discordia

=== Sri Syadasti ===
The third "apostle of Eris & who they be's" name, Sri Syadasti Syadavaktavya Syadasti Syannasti Syadasti Cavaktavyasca Syadasti Syannasti Syadavatavyasca Syadasti Syannasti Syadavaktavyasca (commonly called just Sri Syadasti), is Sanskrit, and means: All affirmations are true in some sense, false in some sense, meaningless in some sense, true and false in some sense, true and meaningless in some sense, false and meaningless in some sense, and true and false and meaningless in some sense.

=== The Sacred Chao ===
The Sacred Chao

A unique symbol created in Discordianism, the Sacred Chao is said to have been devised by the Apostle Hung Mung in ancient China. It is a modified version of the Yin-Yang, a common symbol in Taoism. The Sacred Chao is not the Yin-Yang of the Taoists. On one side of the Sacred Chao is a pentagon and on the other depicts the golden Apple of Discord. The Sacred Chao symbolizes absolutely everything anyone would need to ever know about anything, and more. It even symbolizes everything not worth knowing, depicted by the internal empty space surrounding.

Discordians pronounce "chao" as "cow", thus making the terms "Sacred Chao", "Holy Chao", and "Wholly Chao", into puns and inside jokes.

=== Operation Mindfuck ===
Operation Mindfuck is an important practice in the Discordian religion, in which "all national calamities, assassinations, or conspiracies" are publicly attributed to the Bavarian Illuminati, an 18th-century secret society, in an attempt to "sow the culture with paranoia". The concept was developed by Kerry Thornley and Robert Anton Wilson in 1968 and given its name by Wilson and Robert Shea in The Illuminatus! Trilogy.

Operation Mindfuck uses many of the recurring themes of Discordianism, including "hidden knowledge, secret societies, chaos magic, ancient cults, mysterious rituals and conspiracy theories". Stuart Rathbone described it as "a deliberate campaign of revolutionary disinformation" and notes that "many of these topics have had a lasting impact on anarchism, the pseudo-sciences and even mainstream culture."

== Writings ==
Discordian works include a number of books, including Principia Discordia, drafted in 1963 and first published in 1965 (which includes portions of The Honest Book of Truth); and The Illuminatus! Trilogy, which had its first volume published in 1975.

=== Principia Discordia editions ===
The first edition was printed using Jim Garrison's Xerox printer in 1963. The second edition was published under the title Principia Discordia or How The West Was Lost in a limited edition of five copies (and released into the public domain) in 1965.

In 1978, a copy of the work from Kerry Thornley, under the title The Principia Discordia or How the West Was Lost, was placed in the HSCA JFK collections as document 010857. Adam Gorightly said he had been given Greg Hill's copy of the first edition. This appeared in its entirety in Historia Discordia, a book on Discordian history released in spring of 2014.

=== Related works ===
The Discordian movement encompasses a diverse array of works, both real and fictitious, that explore themes of chaos, satire, and alternative spirituality. These include Zen Without Zen Masters by Camden Benares, which presents koans and stories of a Discordian nature, and Zenarchy by Kerry Thornley, which proposes a non-combative approach to anarchy infused with Zen philosophy. Natural Law, or Don't Put a Rubber on Your Willy by Robert Anton Wilson delves into themes of personal freedom and self-awareness, expanding upon Wilson's essay originally published in 1985. In addition, there are compilations such as Apocrypha Discordia and Historia Discordia, which gather diverse materials from the Discordian tradition, including writings by both original and contemporary Discordians.

Several works also explore the lives of key figures within Discordianism, such as The Prankster and the Conspiracy by Adam Gorightly, which focuses on Kerry Thornley's interactions with countercultural figures like Lee Harvey Oswald. Chasing Eris by Brenton Clutterbuck provides an in-depth examination of Discordianism's impact on various aspects of culture and society, offering interviews and insights into the movement's global reach and influence.

== Religious studies ==
Academic interest in Discordianism has grown over the years, with scholars examining its role in the broader context of new religious movements (NRMs) and its reflection of the social and cultural upheavals of the 20th century. The religion’s ability to blur the lines between parody and serious belief has made it a unique subject of study in the field of religious studies and has contributed to ongoing discussions about the nature of religion in the modern world.

The first academic study of Discordianism was David Chidester's 2005 book Authentic Fakes, who wrote that "If it were possible to trace a genealogy of virtual religions on the Internet, it would probably begin with Discordianism." According to J. Christian Greer, this study was published just at the time Discordianism had transformed itself from a parody religion to a new religious movement.

The entry for Discordianism in Rabinovitch and Lewis's Encyclopedia of Modern Witchcraft and Neo-Paganism (2002) defines Discordianism as "somewhere between parody, social commentary, and religion". However, David G. Robertson writes that "Although Hill and Thornley started Discordianism as a joke, then, they came in time to believe, if not entirely trust, in Eris." Robertson discusses Discordian theology in the 2012 book Handbook of New Religions and Cultural Production, writing that despite Discordian claims that its "catmas" are soft, optional beliefs:

Nevertheless, the Principia Discordia contains a complex and subtle religious system, although this is often obscured by its chaotic structure. The theology of the Principia is perhaps best summarized in the symbol ... The Sacred Chao .... Taken as a whole, however, the Sacred Chao symbolizes the Discordian idea that both order and chaos are man-made concepts, and that to believe that either is more "true" than the other is illusion. The Sacred Chao represents 'pure chaos', the metaphysical grounding of all that is, and a level beyond any distinction-making.

Robertson writes in the 2016 book Fiction, Invention and Hyper-reality that:

... Discordians have also constructed a complex and unique cosmology and theology, and Discordianism has over time come to be considered as having genuine religious significance for many of its adherents. Thus Discordianism can no longer be considered a purely parodic religion.

== Influence ==
Discordianism has exerted a notable influence on several facets of counterculture, particularly during the 1960s and 1970s. One of the religion's key contributions lies in its challenge to established norms through the use of humor, satire, and paradox. This approach mirrored the broader countercultural movements that sought to upend conventional thinking and embrace new forms of expression.

Discordianism’s foundational text, the Principia Discordia, became a cornerstone for other works that blend satire with serious philosophical inquiry. A prime example is Robert Anton Wilson and Robert Shea’s The Illuminatus! Trilogy (1975), which played a significant role in spreading Discordian ideas. The trilogy’s mix of conspiracy theory, satire, and occultism deeply resonated with the countercultural mindset and has been credited with influencing later works in both literature and popular culture.

Moreover, Discordianism has impacted the development of NRMs by promoting a model of religious practice that is decentralized, playful, and often ironic. This model has informed other NRMs that prioritize personal spiritual experiences over rigid dogma. In particular, Discordianism's embrace of paradox and chaos has inspired movements that reject traditional religious hierarchies in favor of more fluid and adaptable structures.

=== In popular culture ===
The Discordian phrase "Hail Eris! All Hail Discordia!" can be heard in the background on many rock albums.

== See also ==
- 23 enigma
- Chaos magic
- Church of the SubGenius
- Discordian calendar
- Marvel Whiteside Parsons
- Religion and the Internet
- Religious satire
- Karl Koch (hacker)
- SNAFU Principle
- Symbol of Chaos
- The All
- The Void
- Trivialism
