= Bomb Factory (band) =

Japanese rock band

- Origin: Tokyo, Japan
- Genres: Hardcore punk, Melodic hardcore, Heavy metal
- Years active: 1991–present
- Labels: Monstar; Hell Hornet/Limited; Sea Green/Toshiba EMI; N2O Records; Caffeine Bomb Records
- Members: Jun-ya; Kazuya; Joe; Shira
- Website: Official website

Bomb Factory (Japanese: ボム・ファクトリー) is a band from Tokyo, Japan with styles influenced by 1970s and '80s hardcore punk, hard rock, and heavy metal music. Although their mother tongue is Japanese, almost all the music they have produced since 1997 has English song titles and lyrics.

== History ==
Brothers Jun-ya and Kazuya grew up in Yamagata and later relocated to Tokyo, where they met Joe and Shira and established their band in 1991. In 1999, they began the event High Blood Pressure in which they and other Japanese rock bands showcase in. They have staged several of these events and still continue it today. In May 2008, they signed with California label N2O Records and subsequently released Moshing Through Tokyo in August.

== Band members ==
- Jun-ya - vocals
- Kazuya - guitar, vocals
- Joe - bass guitar, vocals
- Shira - drums, vocals

== Discography ==
=== Studio albums ===
- Blade of a Knife (1996)
- Go This Way (2002)
- Another Day, Another Life (2004)
- Social Suicide (2006)
- Closed (2010)

== See also ==
- List of bands from Japan
