= Prunella Gee =

English therapist and actress

- Born: 17 February 1950 (age 76); London, England
- Occupations: Counsellor, therapist
- Years active: 1973–2004, 2013
- Spouse: Ken Campbell (m. 1978; div. 1983)
- Children: Daisy Campbell

Prunella Mary Gee (born 17 February 1950) is an English counsellor, therapist and former actress, best known for her work as an actress in the 1970s and 1980s, and for the role of Doreen Heavey in Coronation Street, a part she first played in 1999. Doreen appeared in 17 episodes before returning as a permanent character in 2002 and 2003. She came back the following year for three episodes, proving to be Gee's final television role.

== Early life and education ==
The daughter of a businessman living in Rutland, Gee was privately educated at Benenden School, where she was in the year below Princess Anne.

Wanting to become an actress, she studied at the London Academy of Music and Dramatic Art, where she won the Spotlight Award for Best Actress in 1972; she then spent six months in repertory performing in works by J. B. Priestley, George Bernard Shaw, William Shakespeare, Georges Feydeau and Joe Orton.

== Television and film work ==
Her first television role was as Anna Fitzgerald in Granada Television's 1930s drama serial Shabby Tiger (1973), in which she rose to overnight notoriety by becoming the first actress to show full frontal nudity on British television. She was quickly hailed as Britain's answer to Brigitte Bardot or Sophia Loren. In a 2002 interview, Gee recalled: "I was working in serious theatre, but got a reputation of being a sex symbol. I was too young to know any better so I tended to go with the flow."

Gee made her film debut in 1975, alongside Sidney Poitier, Michael Caine, and Nicol Williamson, in The Wilby Conspiracy, for which she was nominated Best Newcomer in the Evening News Film Awards. The same year she starred as journalist Sandy Williams in Cover Story, episode 8 of the police drama series The Sweeney.

Throughout the 1970s and 1980s, Gee had guest roles in many television shows, including Return of the Saint, The Glittering Prizes, Hammer House of Horror, The Professionals, and Alas Smith & Jones. She also made regular appearances on the game shows Call My Bluff and Give Us A Clue.

In 1976, Gee starred as Sheila in Waris Hussein's production of Waiting For Sheila for the ITV Sunday Night Drama slot.

She appeared as Del Henney's girlfriend Rebecca Westgate in the second series of the ITV drama serial Fallen Hero in 1979.

In 1981, she starred as Miss Griffin in Nigel Kneale's short-lived LWT sci-fi comedy series Kinvig, alongside Tony Haygarth.

In 1983, she appeared opposite Sean Connery as nurse Patrica Fearing in the James Bond film Never Say Never Again. Other movies throughout the decade included 1985's Number One, where she played a news reporter interviewing Bob Geldof's lead character, and in 1988 she played Sting's wife in Stormy Monday.

In 1985, she appeared as Penelope Keith's disruptive actress sister in the ITV sitcom Moving, and the following year co-starred with Pat Phoenix in Constant Hot Water.

In 1989, she made a guest appearance in the Going Away episode of the ITV comedy series After Henry, and another in the short-lived comedy series, Split Ends, starring Anita Dobson, in a part specially created for her in the episode titled The Brush Off.

In 1998, she played Catherine McKay, a fading adult film star in the romantic comedy film Merchants of Venus, filmed in Los Angeles, in which she starred with Michael York, Beverly D'Angelo and Brian Cox. Although well received by the critics, Merchants of Venus was not made commercially available until 2002, when it was released on DVD.

Gee's last television role was as Doreen Heavey in Coronation Street, the mother of Maxine Peacock and a part she played in regular intervals from 1999 to 2004. The character of Doreen was scatty and flirty, and during her time on the show, had a brief flirtation with Mike Baldwin, a feud with Vera Duckworth, and was a constant source of irritation for her son-in-law Ashley Peacock, when she arrived at his and Maxine's house following a split with her husband Derek, whom she was reconciled with in 2003.

== Theatre work ==
Gee has had a long and varied career on the stage. David Storey cast her in his production of The Farm in 1973, her future husband Ken Campbell gave her the role of the Goddess of Chaos in his acclaimed play Illuminatus in 1976, and in 1988, she played all three women in Last of the Red Hot Lovers.

From 1989 to 1990, she starred as the blind Suzy in a national tour of Wait Until Dark. She took on the double role of Alice in Double Take, at the Liverpool Playhouse in 1990. The same year she devised and starred in Warhola with Snoo Wilson as Warhol (taken from The Philosophy of Andy Warhol) at Offstage and the Carib Theatre, Trinidad.

From 1991 to 1992, she acted in the play Time and Time Again, which included dates at the Theatre Royal, Bath. Shortly after, she played Romaine in the Agatha Christie play Witness for the Prosecution.

In 1994, she appeared as Kate in William Shakespeare's The Taming of the Shrew, a production which was directed by Val May.

Gee gave up acting in 2004. She briefly returned in 2013 when she appeared in the short film Trimming Pablo.

== Post-acting career ==
Since 2006, she has worked as a counsellor and therapist in Camden, London.

On 13 April 2013, Gee appeared as the very special guest at a 43tv Retro TV Sweeney Meet in Hammersmith, London where she gave an after dinner talk about her career in television and film.

The same month, in her capacity as a counsellor, Gee was interviewed on Jo Good's BBC London 94.9 radio show, talking about addiction. On the programme, Gee revealed that she had given up acting because she had started her training as a counsellor whilst she was by then playing "mums and grannies", and there were not as many acting parts for her. She had tried to do the two together, but realised that she could not give her full attention to both. Gee said that she "bravely" said to her agent: "that's it", and that she wanted to be taken out of Spotlight. She added: "It was the most liberating thing I've ever done".

== Personal life ==
Gee married the actor and director Ken Campbell in 1978, with whom she had a daughter, Daisy; the couple divorced after five years but remained on good terms.

== Filmography ==
=== Film ===
Year	Title	Role	Notes
1975	The Wilby Conspiracy	Rina Van Niekirk	
1981	Cry Freedom!	Susan	
1983	Never Say Never Again	Patricia Fearing	
1988	Stormy Monday	Mrs. Finney	
1998	Merchants of Venus	Catherine Lucky McKay	
1998	Easy Target	Wife	Short film
2013	Trimming Pablo	Edna	Short film

=== Television ===
Year	Title	Role	Notes
1973	Shabby Tiger	Anna Fitzgerald	Mini-series; episodes 1–7
1975	The Sweeney	Sandy Williams	Series 1; episode 8: "Cover Story"
1975	The Last of the Best Men	Annette	Television film
1975	Quiller	Diane	Episodes 2 & 5: "Tango Briefing" and "Assault on the Ritz"
1976	The Glittering Prizes	Carol Richardson	Mini-series; episode 6: "A Double Life"
1976	The Sunday Drama	Sheila Seathwaite	Series 1; episode 4: "Waiting for Sheila"
1978	Return of the Saint	Leila Sabin	Episode 4: "One Black September"
1978–1979	Fallen Hero	Rebecca Westgate	Series 1; episode 2, and series 2; episodes 1, 3 & 4
1979	Turtle's Progress	Samantha	Series 1; episode 2
1980	Hammer House of Horror	Mary Winter	Episode 1: "Witching Time"
1980	The Professionals	Sarah Gresham	Series 4; episode 15: "It's Only a Beautiful Picture..."
1981	Kinvig	Miss Griffin	Episodes 1–7
1984	Number One	Interviewer	Television film
1985	Moving	Liz Ford	Episodes 1–6
1985	Alas Smith & Jones	Sarah	Series 2; episode 3: "Jailbreak."
1986	No Place Like Home	Abigail	Series 3; episode 2: "Arthur Acting"
1986	Constant Hot Water	Miranda Thorpe	Episodes 1–6
1988	Executive Stress	Valerie Davenport	Series 3; episodes 1 & 3
1989	After Henry	Alison	Series 2; episode 12: "Going Away"
1989	Split Ends	Jo Thomas	Episode 5: "The Brush Off"
1999–2004	Coronation Street	Doreen Heavey	75 episodes
