= Derek Hilton =

English musician and composer (1927–2005)

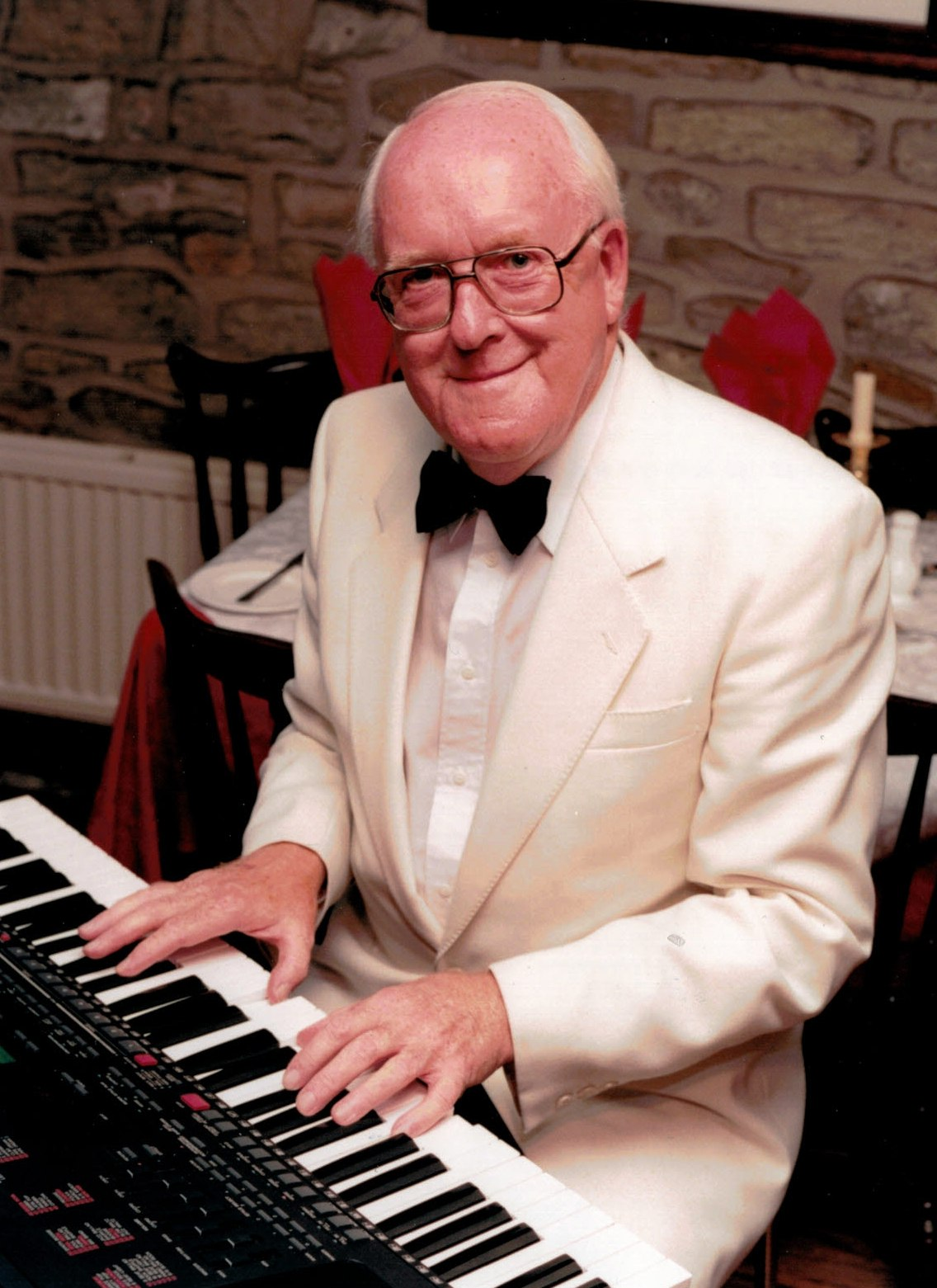

Background information
- Born: Derek Hilton; 3 February 1927; Whitefield, England
- Died: 11 July 2005 (aged 78) Manchester, England
- Occupations: Composer and musician

Derek Redvers Hilton (3 February 1927 – 11 July 2005) was an English musician and composer who worked for most of his professional career as musical director at Granada Television. He is mostly remembered for his television themes and is credited as writing a total of 241. He also composed under the pseudonym John Snow.

== Childhood ==
Derek Hilton was born on 3 February 1927 at a terraced house in Whitefield, near Bury, Lancashire. The son of Alfred Redvers Hilton, a keen amateur operatic singer, and Emily, a Shropshire girl in service as a maid, Derek began piano lessons at six-years old. Showbusiness had fired his imagination after visiting the music hall at Bury Hippodrome, where he recalled the spotlights transforming the dingy hall into a pink and magical palace. 'When I was nine or ten I used to make stages and put tiny musicians on them,' he said. 'I always wanted to play music.’

== Experience ==
By age fourteen Hilton was leading his band 'The Rhythmic Blue Notes' on the accordion. Conscripted at 18, he joined the King's Own Yorkshire Light Infantry and persuaded his officers at Berwick-on-Tweed that he was more useful playing the piano in the Mess than out on the parade ground. Next came postings to Italy, Austria, Germany and France with "Stars in Battledress" alongside Harry Secombe, Peter Sellers and Spike Milligan. Working with stars including Gracie Fields, Kay Kendall and Richard Tauber as pianist and arranger gave him invaluable experience in jotting down parts at high speed for each night's performance.

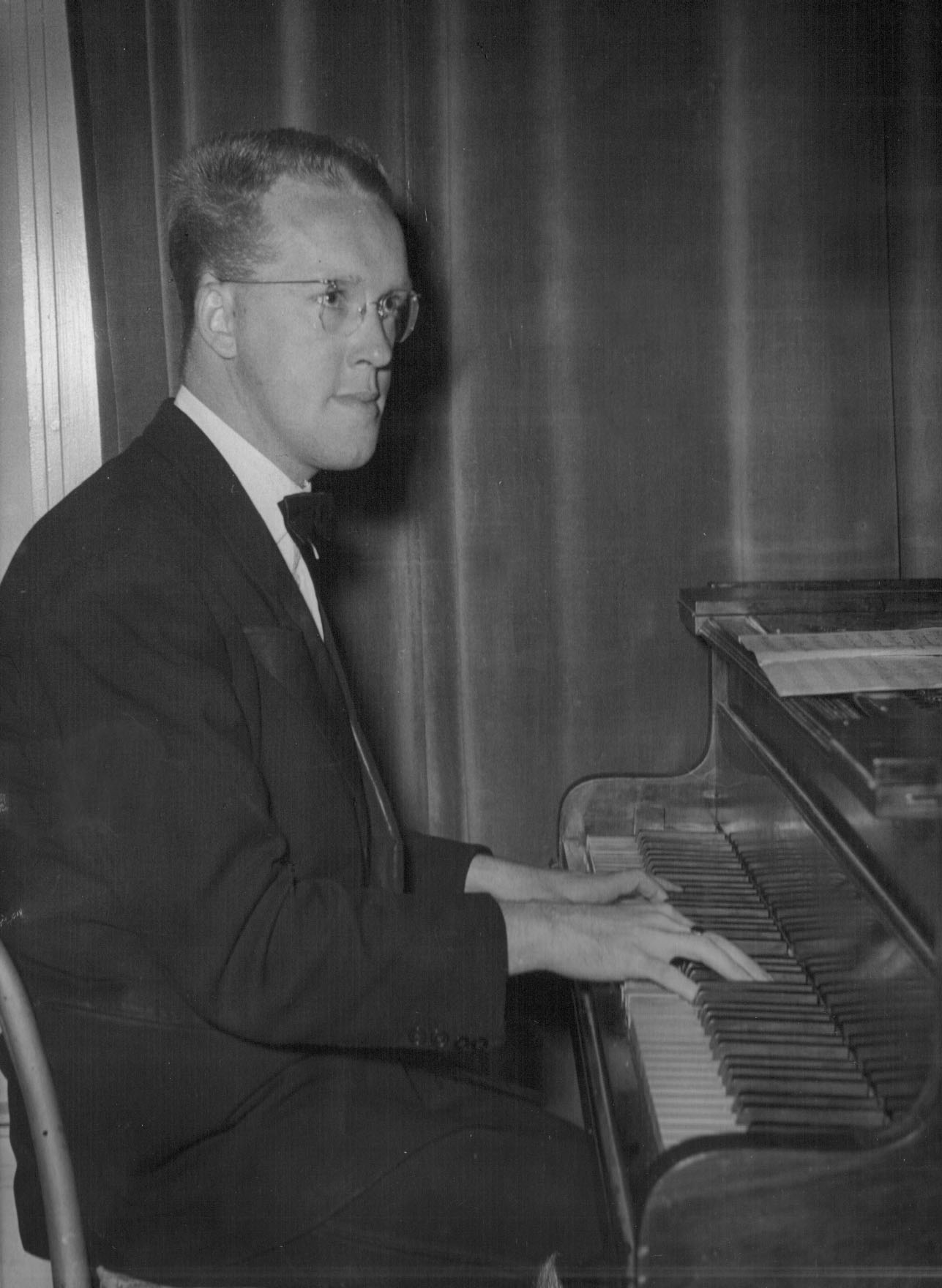
Derek playing in a band in 1950

In Germany Derek met his first wife Mary Witsenburg, a Dutch girl stranded in Hamburg throughout the war and they married in London in 1949. There followed a busy time touring as pianist with orchestras and leaders such as Johnny Dankworth and Sonny Rose, eventually spending three years working in dance bands in Jersey. After settling back in Manchester in 1953, he taught at the Regional Schools of Music led by Johnny Roadhouse at Decibel Studios, Oxford Road.

== Big break ==
Hilton's big break came when his trio provided the music at the Press Reception for the newly launched Granada TV in 1956. A few weeks later, Derek was called in to play 'Mountain Greenery' on 'Spot the Tune' leading to a permanent spot. Soon Derek's professionalism led to his regularly playing at two shows a day, five days a week: ‘Sharp at Four’ and ‘People and Places’ at 6 pm. The Derek Hilton Trio, originally with Derek at the piano, Bob Duffy on bass and Bob Turner at the drums were a staple of Granada’s ‘People and Places’, exchanging sardonic repartee with presenter Billy Grundy. The line-up changed over time to Amos Smith on drums and finally to Dave Lynane on bass and Dave Hassall as drummer. From 1963 – 1964 The Derek Hilton Trio were also resident musicians at Manchester nightclub Mr Smiths. By 1963 Derek had composed, arranged or played more than 500 TV themes.

== Granada Television credits ==
- A Kind of Loving
- All Our Yesterdays
- Big Breadwinner Hog
- The Caesars
- Laurence Olivier Presents: Cat on a Hot Tin Roof, The Glass Menagerie
- Comedians
- Country Matters
- The Corridor People
- Cribb
- Criss-Cross Quiz
- The Cuckoo Waltz
- D H Lawrence
- The Division
- The Dustbin Men
- The Entertainers
- Fallen Hero
- The Flower of Gloster
- The Glamour Girls
- For King and Country
- The Ghosts of Motley Hall
- Granada Close Down Music
- Haunted
- Hickory House
- Inheritance
- ITV Playhouse (12 episodes 1967–1969)
- Judge Dee
- Last of the Baskets
- Leave it to Charlie
- Lift Off
- The Lovers
- Lost Empires
- Man in Room 17
- Maths is Fun
- Murder
- Nearest and Dearest (TV theme and film)
- The Odd Man/It's Dark Outside/Mr Rose (Mr Rose theme composed under pseudonym John Snow)
- Once Upon A Time
- Paris 1900
- Shabby Tiger
- Shades of Darkness
- The Sinners
- Spindoe
- This Year Next Year
- Yanks Go Home

== Notable performance credits ==
- Spot That Tune (209 shows)
- People and Places (Derek Hilton Trio daily spot 1958 -1963)
- World in Action Theme jam
- Coronation Street – piano accompanist to Rita Fairclough (Barbara Knox)
- The Wheeltappers and Shunters Social Club

== Stage credits ==
- Feed
- Clogs

== Awards ==
- Country Matters 1973 Ivor Novello Award, Outstanding Contribution to British Popular Music.

== Nominations ==
- Lost Empires [1987] Best Original Television Music.
- Lost Empires [1987] Ivor Novello nomination for Best Theme

== Miscellaneous work ==
In 1969 he created the theme to radio's long-standing Waggoners' Walk, heard daily on Radio 2. Other credits are incidental music for Sherlock Holmes, Inspector Morse, and Brideshead Revisited. To the general viewer, Hilton was perhaps best known for re-recording and re-arranging the Coronation Street theme in 1972 and accompanying Rita Fairclough (Barbara Knox) at the piano when she sang on the show. He was also a regular at the keyboard at The Wheeltapper's and Shunter's Social Club where he was the MD overseeing 'the turns.' A passionate Bury FC fan, in 1972 Hilton wrote Bury's anthem "Aye, aye, Up the Shakers" sung by The Bury Tones, which was for many years a rousing anthem for Shakers fans.

== Personal life ==
Hilton died on 11 July 2005, leaving a partner - Olivia Swann - and three daughters from a marriage.
