= Cambridge Theatre =

West End theatre in London

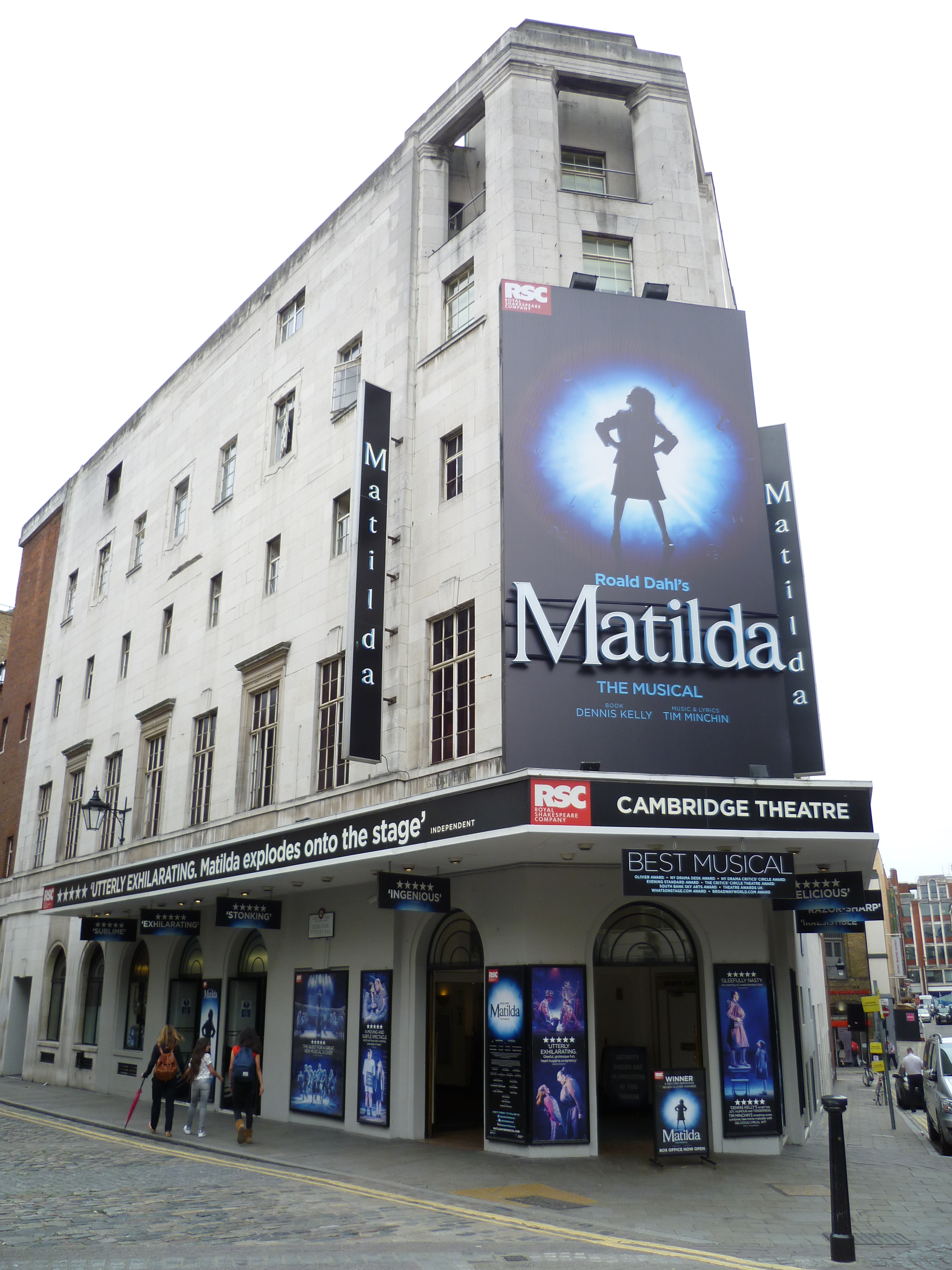
- Cambridge Theatre in 2016
- Interactive map of Cambridge Theatre
- Address: Earlham Street, Seven Dials; London, WC2; United Kingdom
- Coordinates: 51°30′49″N 0°07′36″W
- Owner: LW Theatres
- Capacity: 1,231 on 3 levels
- Type: West End theatre
- Designation: Grade II
- Production: Matilda the Musical
- Public transit: Covent Garden

Construction
- Opened: 4 September 1930; 96 years ago
- Architects: Wimperis, Simpson & Guthrie

Website
- cambridgetheatre.co.uk

The Cambridge Theatre is a West End theatre, on a corner site in Earlham Street facing Seven Dials, in the London Borough of Camden, built in 1929–30 for Bertie Meyer on an "irregular triangular site".

== Design and construction ==
It was designed by Wimperis, Simpson and Guthrie; interior partly by Serge Chermayeff, with interior bronze friezes by sculptor Anthony Gibbons Grinling. The theatre is built in steel and concrete and is known for its elegant and clean lines of design. The theatre was refurbished in 1950—the original gold and silver décor was painted over in red, and candelabras and chandeliers were added. In 1987, to restore the original décor, the theatre was once again refurbished, this time by Carl Toms. The theatre has a circular entrance foyer, with Grinling's bronze frieze depicting nude figures in exercise poses; the theme continues into the main foyer, with dancing nudes, marble pilaster up lighters and concealed lighting.

English Heritage observes:

the Cambridge Theatre is a rare, complete and early example of a London theatre adopting the moderne, expressionist style pioneered in Germany during the 1920s. It marked a conscious reaction to the design excesses of the music hall and contemporary cinemas. Theatres looked for a new style appropriate to the greater sophistication of their entertainment and found it in the Germanic moderne forms of simple shapes enlivened by concealed lighting, shiny steelwork and touches of bright colour; this was not taken up by cinema designers until 1935.

The theatre has been a Grade II listed building since 11 January 1999.

== Productions ==
An early production staged on October 19, 1930, by Ninette De Valois future creator and for many years central figure of the Royal Ballet. She both choreographed (Danse sacree et danse profane – Debussy), and danced (Nicholas Legat's Variations and Coda – Glinka, partnered by Anton Dolin).

Productions at the Cambridge Theatre have been characterised by relatively short runs, interspersed with several dark periods; the theatre was used for trade film shows in the late 1930s, and again in 1969 as a cinema.

Productions have included Athene Seyler and Joan Sims in Breath of Spring by Peter Coke in 1958, Tommy Steele in Half a Sixpence in 1963 (678 performances), Bruce Forsyth in Little Me in 1964 (334 performances), The Black Mikado (1975–76), and in the late 1970s the Kander and Ebb musical Chicago ran for 590 performances. Later, the rock and roll musical Return to the Forbidden Planet, which was based on the film Forbidden Planet and Shakespeare's The Tempest using 1950s and 1960s songs opened in September 1989 and ran until early 1993, winning the Olivier Award for Best New Musical, instead of the favourite, Miss Saigon.

The show Jerry Springer: The Opera ran from 14 October 2003 – 19 February 2005. This was followed by a month run of illusionist Derren Brown's Something Wicked This Way Comes tour, before the London première of Flying Music's Dancing in the Streets, which opened on 7 July 2005. This finished its run on 22 April 2006 and Chicago moved across Theatreland from the Adelphi Theatre to continue its London run into its tenth year at the theatre that originally hosted the show in the 1970s. It opened at the Cambridge on Friday 28 April. Chicago cancelled all performances post 27 August 2011, when it closed at the theatre. Matilda the Musical commenced performances at The Cambridge from 18 October 2011, with an official opening night on 22 November 2011. As of April 2017, Matilda became the longest running production in the theatre's history.

=== Recent Productions ===
- Grease (24 October 1996 – 11 September 1999) by Jim Jacobs and Warren Casey, starring at various times Shane Richie and Ben Richards
- Great Balls of Fire (6 October – 18 December 1999)
- The Beautiful Game (26 September 2000 – 1 September 2001) by Andrew Lloyd Webber and Ben Elton
- Fame (20 September 2001 – 31 August 2002)
- Our House (28 October 2002 – 16 August 2003) by Madness and Tim Firth
- Jerry Springer: The Opera (14 October 2003 – 19 February 2005), starring David Soul
- Something Wicked This Way Comes (2 June – 2 July 2005), by Andy Nyman and Derren Brown
- Dancing in the Streets (19 July 2005 – 22 April 2006)
- Chicago (27 April 2006 – 27 August 2011)
- Matilda the Musical (since 24 November 2011), by Dennis Kelly and Tim Minchin
- Showstopper! The Improvised Musical (since 22 May 2023), by Dylan Emery and Adam Meggido, which usually takes place one Monday each month

== Gallery ==
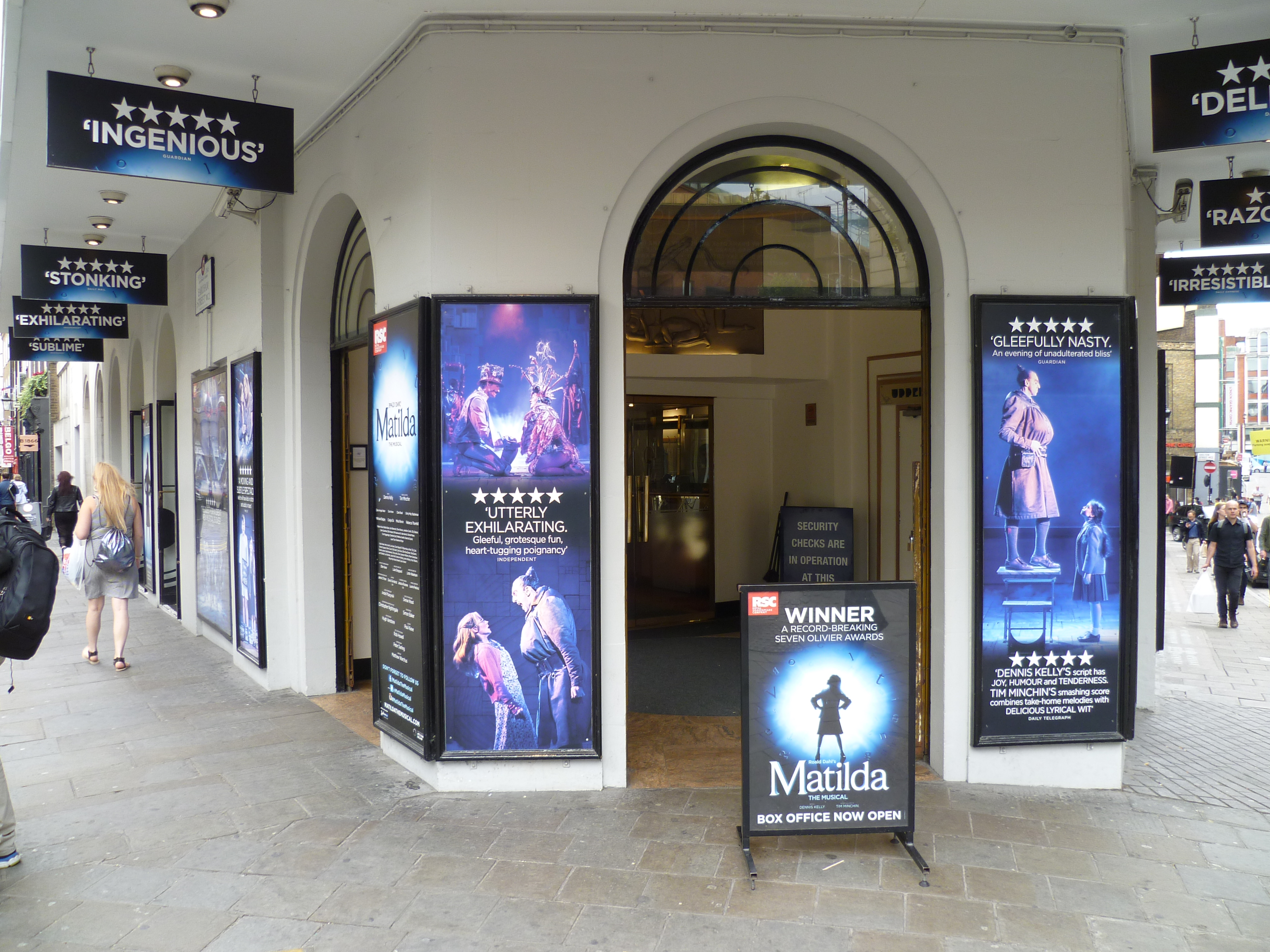
The entrance

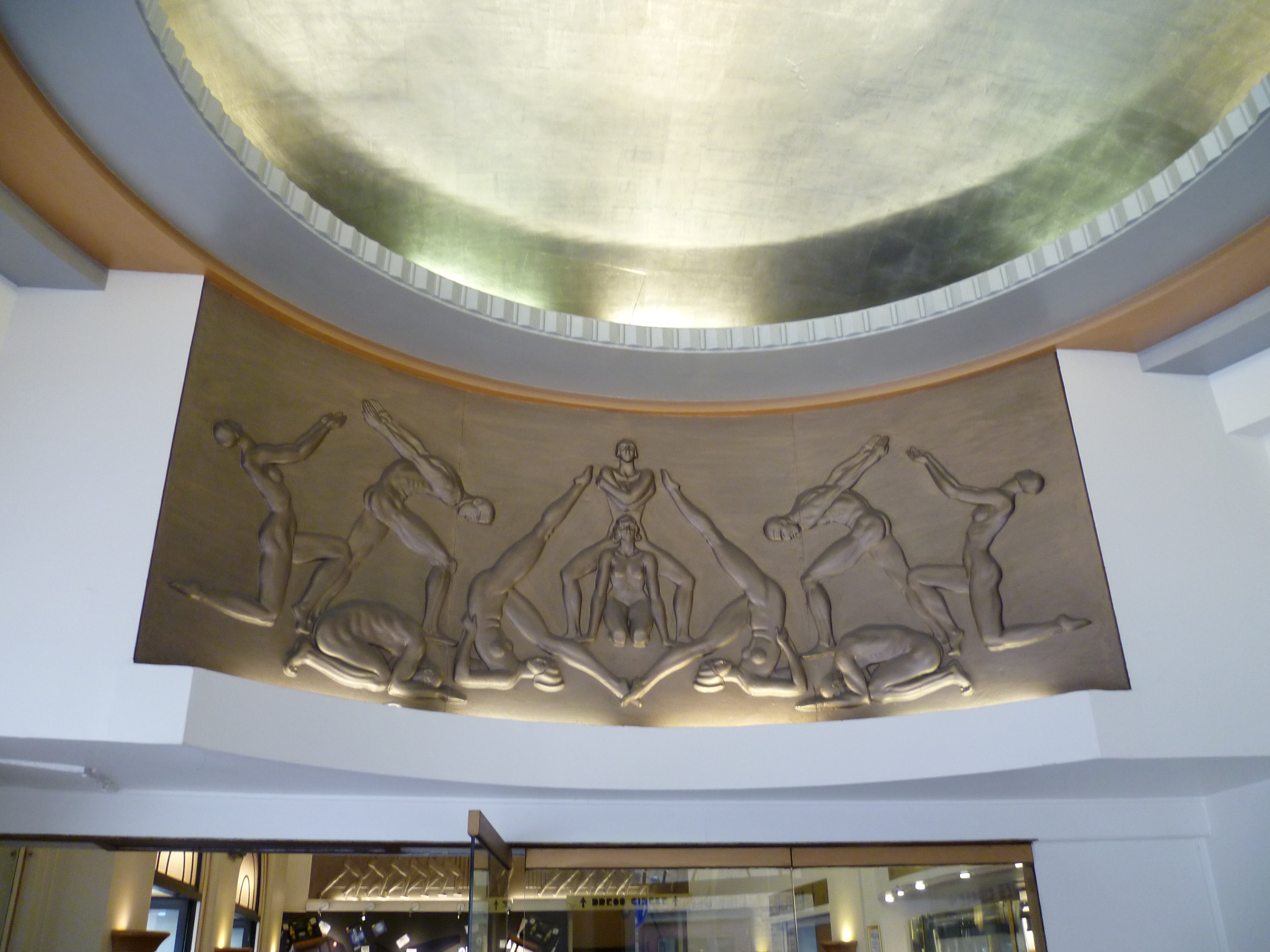
The frieze above the entrance.

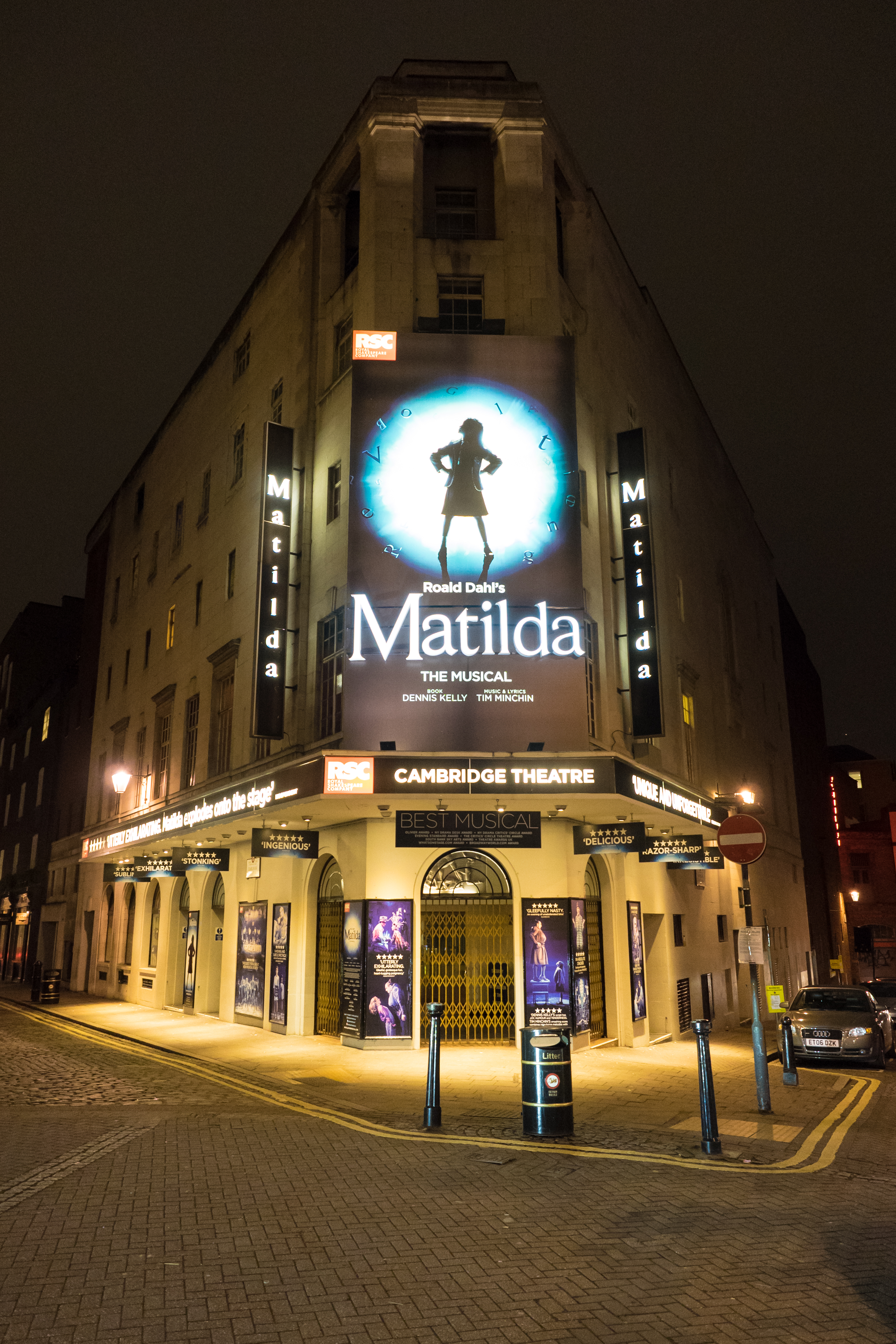
Matilda sign illuminated during the night
