= Neil Oram =

British musician and poet

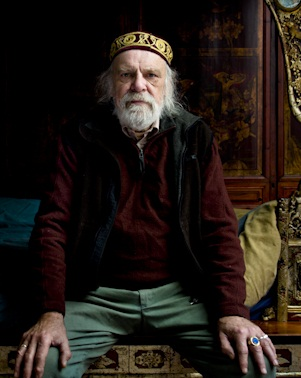
- London Fields, Hackney, October 2010
- Born: Neil R. G. Oram; 2 January 1938 (age 88); Torquay, Devon, England

Neil Oram (born 2 January 1938) is a British musician, poet, artist, and playwright. He is best known for his 10-play cycle, The Warp, directed by Ken Campbell.

== Soho, jazz, art and poetry career ==
While in Africa, Oram met musician Mike Gibbs, and played double bass in the Mike Gibbs Quintet with Gibbs playing piano, vibes and trombone.

A post-concert epiphany when a voice repeatedly told him, "Je suis un poète!" led Oram to take up writing.

Oram returned to Britain in 1958 where he ran a jazz café called The House of Sam Widges on 8 D'Arblay Street in Soho, London. The café was known for its jukebox that only had modern jazz records. It attracted many highly regarded musicians in London, such as Ronnie Scott, Tubby Hayes, Graham Bond, Dave Tomlin and Bobby Wellins, all of whom were frequent customers. The café also had a performance stage called "The Pad".

At that point, Oram was writing poetry, giving readings and painting large, abstract, jazz inspired paintings.

In 1960, he opened "The Mingus" art gallery in Marshall Street, Soho, where abstract paintings by O. G. Bradbury, George Popperwell, Jaime Manzano, Tony Shiels and William Morris, the American poet and action painter, were exhibited. Morris's jazz paintings were executed in The Pad to the vibrant sounds of the Graham Bond Quartet, then carried and hung up in The Mingus.

Oram's poems and other writings can be found in underground magazines from the late 1950s onwards, like Night Scene published by Lee Harwood, and International Times (IT) Oram also contributed to the Poetry Review, edited by Eric Mottram, a mainstay of the modernist-inspired British Poetry Revival of the 1960s and 1970s.

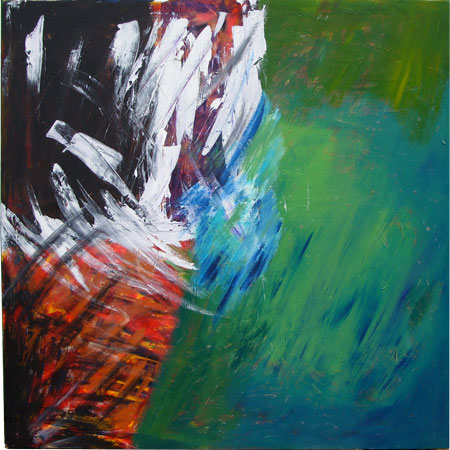
Spring Again (2006)- Neil Oram

Oram’s published poems were collected in ‘Children of Albion’ (Penguin 1968), ‘Words-re-arranged’ (Privately printed, 1970), ‘Past The Antique Pain’ (Zum Zum 1974), ‘Beauty’s Shit’ (Zum Zum 1976), ‘The Golden Forgotten’ (Great Works 1977), ‘Yes To The Fresh’ (Zum Zum 1995). A select collection of poems drawn from 56 years of poetry, The Rain Stands Tall, was published in 2015 by Barncott Press.

Oram has painted abstract pieces of art over a long period of time out of which most have not been shown in public. The paintings include a series of twenty geometric images, the Diamond Series, painted over two decades.

== The Warp ==
The Warp's hero is called Phil Masters, named after the blind poet Philip Bourke Marston, who lived from 1850 to 1887. The play traces the hero’s many previous lives over a period of thousands of years. The Warp appears in the Guinness Book of Records as the longest play ever performed. Lasting upwards of 22 hours when performed fully, the Phil Masters character is on stage for all but five minutes, making it one of the most demanding acting roles ever created.

The first performance of The Warp (Warp 1, The Storm's Howling through Tiflis) opened at London's ICA on 2 January 1979, the author's birthday. For the first two weeks the performances were of one play per night. Then, due to the popularity of the play, there were three full, non-stop, 'marathon' performances of all 10 plays, which were also filmed. Performers included Russell Denton (in the lead), Jim Broadbent, Bill Nighy, Maria Moustaka, Stephen Lorne-Williams, Neil Cunningham, Richard Hope and Pat Donovan. In order for Denton to be sufficiently rested to do the marathons, where he would be on stage for 22 hours, Oram himself was called upon to step up and perform the lead in a number of the plays. The ICA performance was documented by the BBC in their Arena arts TV series.

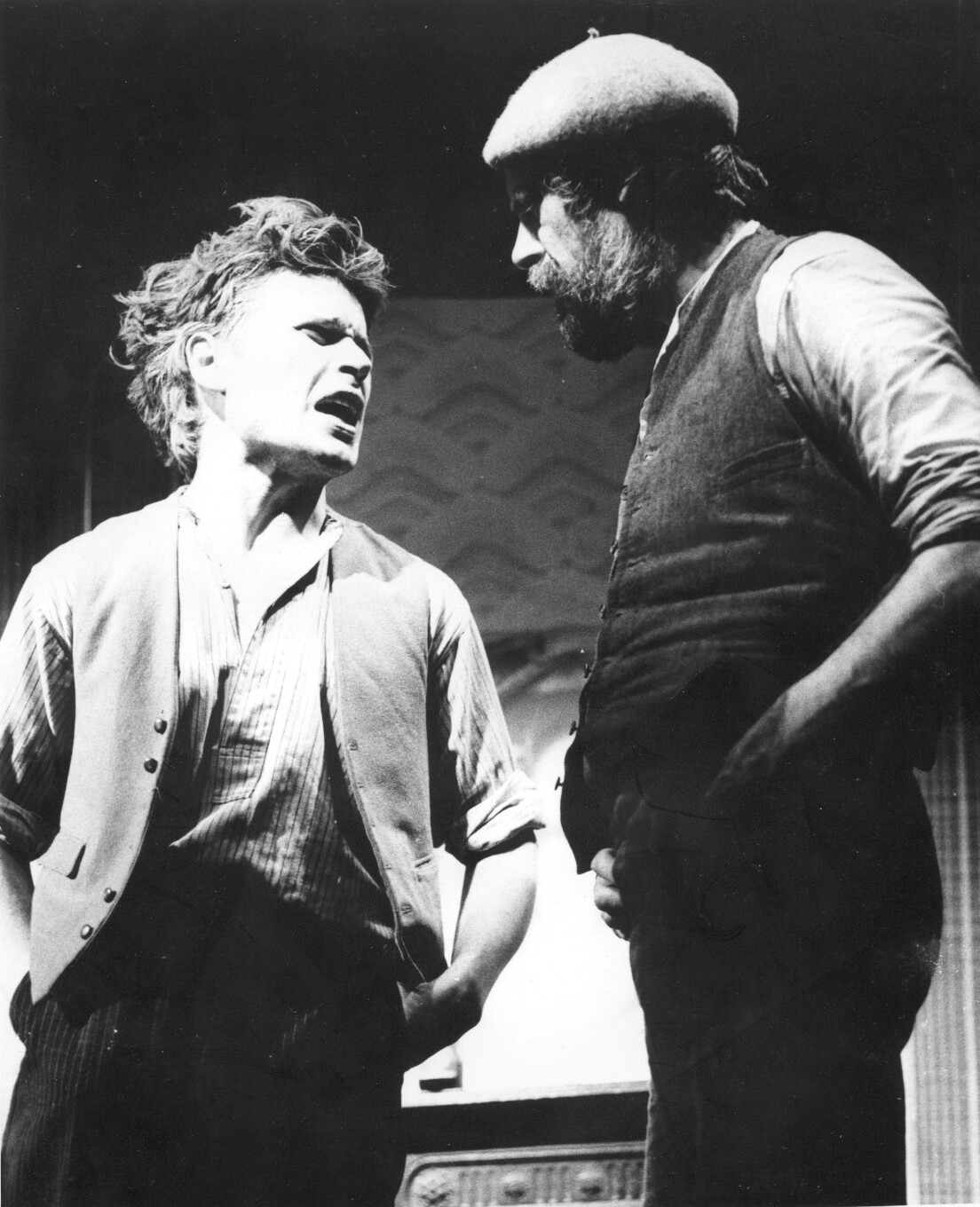
Neil Oram, performing in The Warp's lead role Phil Masters, along with actor Mitch Davies in the role of Marty Mission, at the ICA, London, January 1979. Photograph by Evelyn Honig.

At the 1979 Edinburgh Festival, the abandoned Regent Cinema, on Abby Mount at the A1, was taken over by The Warp troupe who put on five 24-hour marathon performances or "cycles". This was followed with one performance at Hebden Bridge in Yorkshire.

Five further marathon performances followed at the Roundhouse in London in November 1979, also directed by Campbell.

In 1980 Oram was 'resident playwright' at the Everyman Theatre in Liverpool, where The Warp ran for ten weeks. While there, Oram wrote an 11th Warp play entitled Chameleon Blue.

In 1980-82, The Warp was adapted by director Werner Nekes for a film called Uliisses, shot in Germany with The Warp cast. It was screened at the 1982 London Film Festival. In 1984, the film was awarded Best Film at the German Film Critics Association Awards.

The Warp was subsequently turned into a three-volume novel by Oram, published by Sphere Books.

The Warp DVD, a video of the full 18-hour 1979 ICA production is available directly from Oram.

In the 1990s, there were a number of productions of The Warp directed by Ken Campbell's daughter Daisy Campbell.

In the late 1990s, the play was staged at "The Drome" nightclub under the arches of the London Bridge as part of a rave called The Warp Experience that ran for 9 events.

=== Authorship confusion ===
Obituaries on Ken Campbell in The Telegraph and The Guardian say that Ken "wrote" The Warp or "co-wrote" The Warp with Neil Oram. However, other reviews and articles and all known publicity material acknowledges Neil Oram as being the sole author. It seems clear that Ken Campbell directed, but never wrote a word of the Warp and there is no evidence that he ever claimed to have done so.

According to Oram, the true story behind the writing of The Warp is as follows: Ken Campbell "inspired" him to write The Warp as a play after, at the ICA in 1978, Campbell heard Oram give a one-man performance of stories from his life. Campbell suggested dramatization and offered to direct the result. Commissioned by the ICA, and funded by the Arts Council, Oram began working. A brief attempt at collaboration, with Campbell typing up the script, proved impractical. Oram then wrote the entire ten play cycle, by hand, by himself, in Butleigh, Somerset.

== Bibliography ==
- Children of Albion (Penguin, 1968)
- Words-re-arranged (Privately printed, 1970)
- Past The Antique Pain (Zum Zum, 1974)
- Beauty’s Shit (Zum Zum, 1976)
- The Golden Forgotten (Great Works, 1977)
- Yes To The Fresh (Zum Zum, 1995)
- The Warp 1: The Storm's Howling Through Tiflis (Sphere)
- The Warp 2: Lemmings on the Edge (Sphere)
- The Warp 3: The Balustrade Paradox (Sphere, 1982)
- Spy For Love (Oberon, 2002)
- Inside Out (Barncott Press, 2013)
- The Friends of Deception (Barncott Press, 2013)
- The Rain Stands Tall (Barncott Press, 2015)

== Filmography ==
- Uliisses (1982, director: Werner Nekes, 35mm, 94 mins)
