= Merchants of Venus =

1998 romantic comedy film

Merchants of Venus is a romantic comedy film starring British actors Michael York and Prunella Gee. It was written and directed by Len Richmond, writer of the award-winning British comedy series Agony and the less successful Split Ends. The film was released in the US in March 1998 and was given a straight to DVD release in the UK on 1 September 2001, renamed as A Dirty Little Business. In some countries, it was released under the title Good Vibrations.

The film is certified as a 15, runs for 74 minutes, and original music is provided by the band Erasure who performed the track Love Affair. The band's lead singer Andy Bell has a small role in the movie as the director of an adult film that Gee's character is playing in.

The movie was actually filmed in Len Richmond's mother's own sex toy factory in Los Angeles.

== Plot ==
Merchants of Venus tells the story of Alex (Michael York), a shy Russian immigrant who arrives in Los Angeles to seek the American dream. However, the only job he secures is that of working in a low-paid factory that manufactures sex toys. The factory's elderly owner Eppy (Nancy Fish) adopts Alex as her son and tries to set him up with her close friend, lonely, fading adult movie star Catherine (Gee). A love affair between the two lonely people develops and old-fashioned Alex tries to convince the cynical Catherine that true love does exist. The film also features American actress Beverly D'Angelo as an adult performer called Mistress Cody, and Scottish actor Brian Cox as Alex's uncle.

== Cast ==
- Michael York as Alex Jakoff
- Prunella Gee as Catherine McKay
- Nancy Fish as Eppy
- Beverly D'Angelo as Mistress Cody
- Brian Cox as Uncle Vladimir
- Troy Donahue as FBI Agent
- Michael J. Pollard as The Senator
- Arthur Hiller as Reverend Phillips
- Stephen Nichols as The Stud
- Andy Bell as Porno Director
- Alan Feinstein as Andre

== Background of the actors ==
At the time of release, York was a high-profile actor, appearing in many TV and film productions, notably Austin Powers, released the year before. Gee, on the other hand, was experiencing a career low. She had been a popular actress in Britain throughout the 1970s and 1980s, but hadn't made a film since 1988 and had not appeared on television since 1989. The film served as a comeback of sorts for her, and the following year she landed the role of Doreen Heavey in the British soap opera Coronation Street. Gee's character in the film mirrored herself slightly in that both were fading stars and both were trained to act at the London Academy of Music and Dramatic Art and studied Shakespeare.

Writer and director Len Richmond managed to cast actors Michael York, Beverly D'Angelo, Brian Cox, and Troy Donahue (who played an FBI Agent) via John Schlesinger, who helped him to get in touch with them.

== Critical reception ==
In 1997, a critic who had seen the film early rated it two and a half stars in The Post and Courier newspaper and described it as "a pleasing if uneven sex comedy". Box Office Magazine went higher, and gave it an overall rating of three and a half stars.
