= Kinvig =

- The original DVD cover with Kinvig and Miss Griffin
- Genre: Science fiction
- Written by: Nigel Kneale
- Directed by: Brian Simmons
- Starring: Tony Haygarth; Patsy Rowlands; Prunella Gee; Colin Jeavons
- Country of origin: United Kingdom
- Original language: English
- No. of series: 1
- No. of episodes: 7

Production
- Running time: 30 minutes
- Production company: London Weekend Television

Original release
- Network: ITV
- Release: 4 September – 16 October 1981

Kinvig is a 1981 science fiction comedy television series made by London Weekend Television which ran for one series of seven episodes. It was the only sitcom written by Nigel Kneale who was more famous for creating serious science fiction dramas such as Quatermass and its sequels, and it was directed and produced by Les Chatfield, with original music by Nigel Hess.

== Synopsis ==
Ineffectual dreamer Des Kinvig (Tony Haygarth) runs a rundown little electrical repair shop in the small town of Bingleton where he lives with his mumsy, scatterbrained wife Netta (Patsy Rowlands) and oversized pet dog Cuddly.

One day his shop is visited by the beautiful, sharp-tongued Miss Griffin (Prunella Gee) who seems at first just another dissatisfied customer.

However, after encountering a flying saucer while walking the dog one night, Kinvig discovers she is actually a scantily-clad alien from the planet Mercury who desperately needs the help of the scruffy, bearded Des' "exceptional brain" to stop an invasion of the evil ant-like Xux who are replacing people with robot duplicates.

Kinvig's friend Jim Piper (Colin Jeavons) is a lifelong UFO watcher and wild-eyed conspiracy buff who is consumed by jealousy when Des tells him about his extraterrestrial exploits.

It is left intentionally ambiguous whether Kinvig's experiences with aliens are real or the product of an overactive imagination.

In early 2004 it was reported that Edgar Wright was working on a script for a big-screen adaptation of Kinvig; however although initially green lit, the project was eventually dropped.

== Reception ==
Around the time of original transmission, Kinvig was positively reviewed by The Times, the preview stating that "Cast splendid, direction deft".

However, to later TV historians, Kinvig is not considered to be one of Kneale's better productions. The Guinness Book of Classic British TV claims that apart from Jeavons' performance, Kinvig was "a huge disappointment".

Peter Nicholls also criticised the programme, saying the scripts "lacked the precision required for decent farce". Nicholls also noted that some viewers objected to Kneale's depiction of science-fiction fans as being the same as UFO enthusiasts, and states Kinvig is notable for its "contemptuous treatment" of the leading characters.

Science fiction historian Brian Stableford dismissed Kinvig as "very silly" and echoed Nicholls' criticism of the show, calling Kneale's script "ignorant" for implying that all science fiction fans are also obsessed with UFOs.

== Cast ==
- Tony Haygarth as Des Kinvig
- Patsy Rowlands as Netta Kinvig
- Prunella Gee as Miss Griffin
- Colin Jeavons as Jim Piper
- Danny Schiller as Sagga
- Stephen Bent as Loon
- Alan Bodenham as Bat
- Simon Williams as Buddo
- Patrick Newell as Mr. Horsley
- Betty Hardy as Mrs. Snell

== See also ==
- List of science fiction television programs
