= Fallen Hero (TV series) =

- Genre: Drama
- Written by: Brian Finch
- Starring: Del Henney; Wanda Ventham; Barry Stanton
- Composer: Derek Hilton
- Country of origin: United Kingdom
- Original language: English
- No. of series: 2
- No. of episodes: 12

Production
- Producers: June Howson; Michael Cox
- Running time: 60 minutes
- Production company: Granada Television

Original release
- Network: ITV
- Release: 14 November 1978 – 20 December 1979

Fallen Hero is a British television series that aired on ITV in two series between 1978 and 1979. It portrays a rugby league star forced to retire from the game after an injury, and the struggles of he and his wife to adjust to their new circumstances.

Actors who appeared in episodes of the series include Pauline Delaney, Tessa Peake-Jones, Fiona Mollison, Maggie Ollerenshaw, Timothy Carlton and Alan MacNaughtan.

== Main cast ==
- Del Henney as Gareth Hopkins
- Wanda Ventham as Dorothy Hopkins
- Barry Stanton as Joe Harris
- John Wheatley as Martin Hopkins
- Frank Crompton as Wilf Calder
- Marged Esli as Sally Jones
- Nesta Harris as Meg Hopkins
- Prunella Gee as Rebecca Westgate
- Jonathan Barlow as Ken Hopkins
- Robert Swann as Philip Birley
- Niall Padden as Tonker

== Bibliography ==
- Lewis, Justin. Benedict Cumberbatch - The Biography. Kings Road Publishing, 2015.
- Palmer, Scott. British Film Actors' Credits, 1895-1987. McFarland, 1988.
