= Daisy Campbell (theatre director) =

British writer, actress and theatre director

- Born: Daisy Eris Campbell; 1978 (age 46–47); England
- Occupation(s): Writer, actress, director
- Years active: 1990s–present
- Parent(s): Ken Campbell; Prunella Gee

Daisy Eris Campbell (born 1978), is a British writer, actress and theatre director. Daughter of actor and director Ken Campbell and actress and therapist Prunella Gee. She staged The Warp, a revival of Neil Oram's 24-hour play (which her father had directed many times in the late seventies and early eighties) at The Everyman Theatre, Liverpool. Campbell also adapted Robert Anton Wilson’s cult autobiographical book Cosmic Trigger for the stage. She played the role of her mother in the play. Cosmic Trigger is a kind of sequel to her father's adaptation of Robert Anton Wilson's Illuminatus!. Allegedly, Daisy was conceived during the original production of Illuminatus! In part, the play of Cosmic Trigger deals with the production of Ken Campbell's adaptation of Illuminatus! in Liverpool in 1976.

In Liverpool, in 2017, she directed the KLF's Welcome to the Dark Ages.

In 2018 Campbell was orchestrating and touring a group reading around Britain of the novelist Alistair Fruish's 46,000-word monosyllabic novel "The Sentence".
