= Barry Stanton (actor) =

British actor (born 1940)

- Born: 17 February 1940 (age 86); Manchester, England
- Occupation: Actor
- Years active: 1963–2007 (film & TV)

Barry Stanton (born 17 February 1940) is a British stage, film and television actor.

== Biography ==
Growing up in Accrington, Stanton discovered he was a good dancer at the age of seven when he played an elf in a school play. He hoped to become a ballet dancer and for nine years studied classical ballet at the Carlotta Ballet School/Blackburn School of Dancing, winning a scholarship to Sadler's Wells Theatre. Unfortunately, while on holiday in France at the age of 15 to watch the Tour de France (he was a keen club cyclist), he was involved in a cycle accident where he caught his foot in a bicycle wheel, resulting in a permanently damaged ankle, ending any hopes of a dancing career.

Stanton then tried chemical engineering but realised this was not the job for him after breaking equipment and blowing up a laboratory. Persuaded by his sister to go to drama school, he went to London, aged 17 and attended the Royal Central School of Speech and Drama alongside Julie Christie and James Bolam. During this time, Stanton worked part-time as a washer-up at a nearby restaurant at nights with Bolam to earn an extra bit of money.

After completing his three-year course at drama school, winning an acting diploma for his performances, Stanton's first professional engagement was with summer repertory in Exmouth. This was followed by various theatre work in other repertories including Liverpool Playhouse Company, as well as going on worldwide tours such as playing Bottom in the Royal Shakespeare Company's production of A Midsummer Night's Dream in 1972–1973 and various roles in The Wars of the Roses with the English Shakespeare Company in 1988 in addition to appearances in film and television.

== Selected filmography ==
=== Film ===
- Robbery (1967)
- King Lear (1971)
- Demons of the Mind (1972)
- Hamlet (1977)
- Sweeney 2 (1977)
- Lionheart (1987)
- King of the Wind (1990)
- Robin Hood (1991)
- Shanghai Knights (2003)

=== Television ===
- The Plane Makers (1963)
- Front Page Story (1965)
- The Baron (1966)
- The Likely Lads (1966)
- Witch Hunt (1967)
- No Hiding Place (1967)
- George and the Dragon (1968)
- Spy Trap (1972)
- Budgie (1972)
- The Sweeney (1975)
- Upstairs, Downstairs (1975)
- The New Avengers (1977)
- Fallen Hero (1978-1979)
- Turtle's Progress (1979-1980)
- Hammer House of Horror (1980)
- The Search for Alexander the Great (1981)
- Something in Disguise (1982)
- Minder (1982)
- Now and Then (1983)
- Doctor Who (1984)
- Tucker's Luck (1984)
- The Young Ones (1984)
- Mann's Best Friends (1985)
- Yes, Prime Minister (1986)
- Ain't Misbehavin' (1995)
- Dalziel and Pascoe (1998)
- The Infinite Worlds of H. G. Wells (2001)

== Bibliography ==
- George W. Brand. British Television Drama in the 1980s. Cambridge University Press, 1993.
