= Hickory House (TV series) =

British children's TV series (1973–1977)

- Genre: Children's television series, Educational
- Presented by: Alan Rothwell; Nicolette Chaffey; Louise Hall-Taylor; Amanda Barrie; Julia North
- Voices of: Barry Smith
- Theme music composer: Derek Hilton
- Country of origin: United Kingdom
- Original language: English
- No. of seasons: 5
- No. of episodes: 129

Production
- Producer: John Coop
- Running time: 10 minutes

Original release
- Network: ITV
- Release: 12 March 1973 – 1 July 1977

Hickory House is a British television programme aimed at pre-school children. It was produced by Granada Television from 1973 to 1977, and broadcast on weekday lunchtimes.

Each programme was usually hosted by a pair of presenters, most often including Alan Rothwell. The setting was a normal house, but in Hickory House, household objects were brought to life through puppetry. The puppet characters included Humphrey Cushion and Dusty Mop. The puppets were created by Barry Smith.

All 129 episodes survive in Granada's archive, although none has yet been released on DVD.
