= Tony Shiels =

English artist, magician, and writer (1938–2024)

Tony "Doc" Shiels
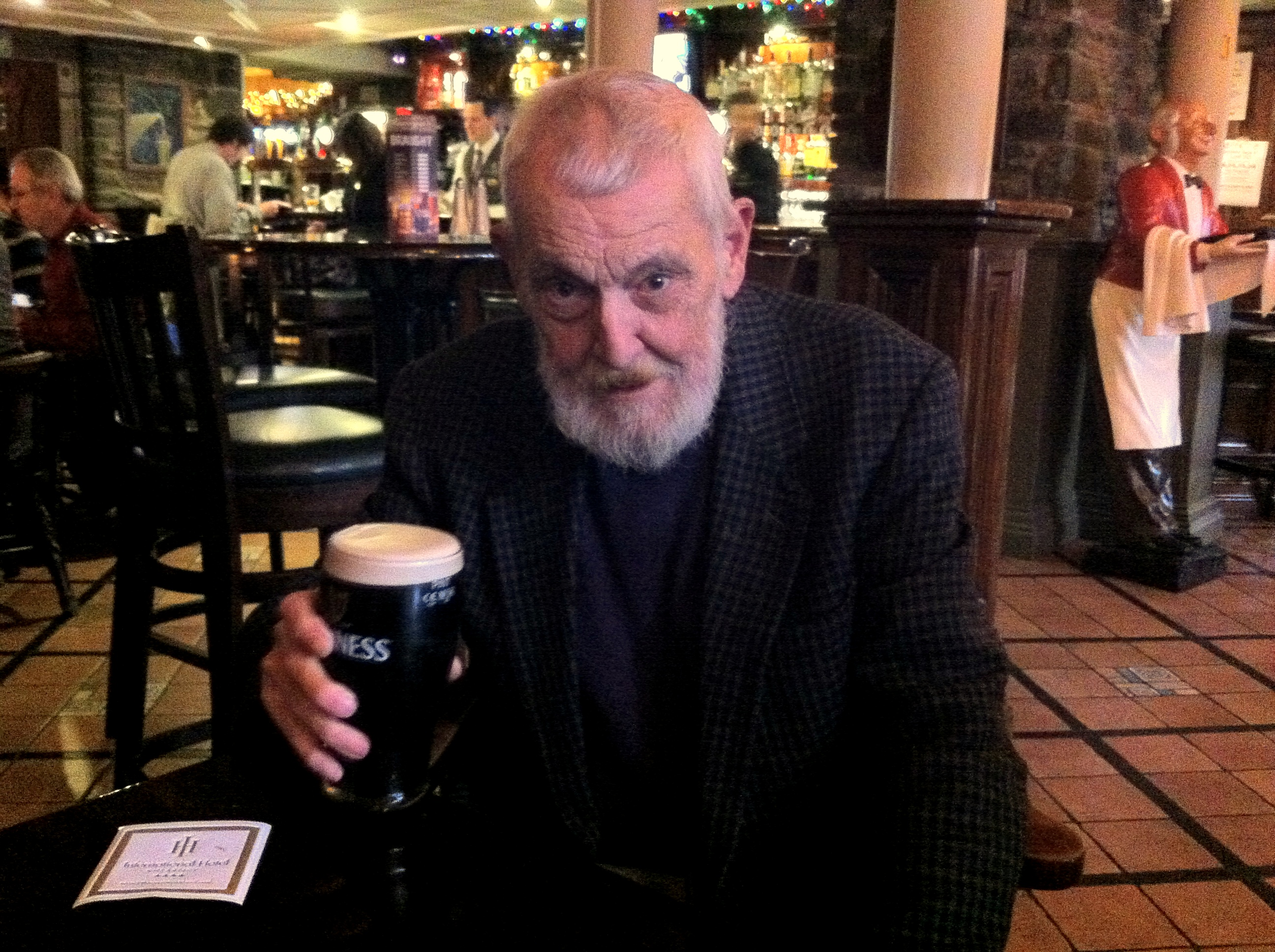
- Shiels at a pub in Killarney, Ireland, in 2015
- Born: 25 May 1938; Salford, England
- Died: 11 July 2024 (aged 86); County Kerry, Ireland
- Occupation(s): Artist, magician, writer, busker, psychic entertainer, hoaxer
- Spouse: Chris Shiels
- Website: http://www.tonyshiels.com

Anthony Nicol "Doc" Shiels (25 May 1938 – 11 July 2024) was an English-born artist, magician and writer. After attending the Heatherley School of Fine Art in London, and briefly studying at the Académie André Lhote in Paris, he moved to St Ives, Cornwall. He arrived in 1958 and stayed in the area until 1963 taking full part in that key period of British Modern Art. In 1961, following the resignation of Barbara Hepworth, he was made a member of the committee of the influential Penwith Society of Arts. In St Ives he ran the progressive 'Steps Gallery', where he showed artists like Brian Wall and Bob Law. He had several solo exhibitions in London mainly at the Rawinsky gallery just off Carnaby Street.

== History ==
Anthony Nicol Shiels was born in Salford, England on 25 May 1938. In the late 1960s, after moving to live in Ponsanooth near Falmouth, he rediscovered stage magic - something he had been taught as a boy by his father and grandfather - and wrote articles for The Linking Ring and The Budget magazines. This included interviews with Ray Harryhausen and Ray Bradbury. He also published a trio of magic books: 13, Something Strange and Daemons Darklings and Doppelgangers which were sold in both the UK and the US and led to him being associated with 1970s bizarre magic.

Between 1970 and 1974, he performed as 'Doc Shiels: Wizard of the West' at festivals and fayres in Cornwall, UK. This, presented with the help of friend Vernon Rose and the rest of the Shiels family, was a magic show that incorporated illusions such as the headless woman, the sub-trunk and the buzz-saw.

In 1975, he set up 'Tom Fool's Theatre of Tom Foolery', which started as a troupe of 'mummers', before he worked closely with the Footsbarn theatre.

He was involved in a series of 'monster-raising' exploits in 1976, which gave him considerable media attention, particularly when he began 'invoking' the monsters with the aid of a coven of nude witches. His attempts to 'raise' Morgawr the Cornish sea monster, were covered by BBC TV, Fortean Times, local newspapers, and appeared in national newspapers such as the Reveille and News of the World. At around the same time he reported on sightings of the 'Owlman' of Mawnan. In 1977 he obtained photos claimed to be of the Loch Ness Monster which appeared on the front page of the Daily Mirror newspaper. This and his associated 'Monstermind Experiment' appeared in other media outlets including The Daily Telegraph and Radio One's Newsbeat.

Alongside the monster-raising, Shiels continued to perform both as Doc Shiels and as a member of Tom Fools Theatre, and he wrote several plays including Spooks, The Gallavant Variations, Nightjars, Cloth Owl the Winking Curtain and Dr Beak Hides his Hands. One of his plays, Distant Humps, was co-produced by Ken Campbell and co-starred Christopher Fairbank. He also had other magic books published, including The Shiels Effect, Bizarre and The Cantrip Codex.

The events of the 1970s and 1980s were covered in his own book, Monstrum, and in the 1996 book Owlman and Others by Jon Downes.

During this period and in the years subsequent he continued to paint and have exhibitions. He considered himself an artist first and foremost, and his life's work to be a form of surrealism that he referred to as 'surrealchemy'.

Shiels died in County Kerry, Ireland on 11 July 2024, at the age of 86.

== Gallery ==
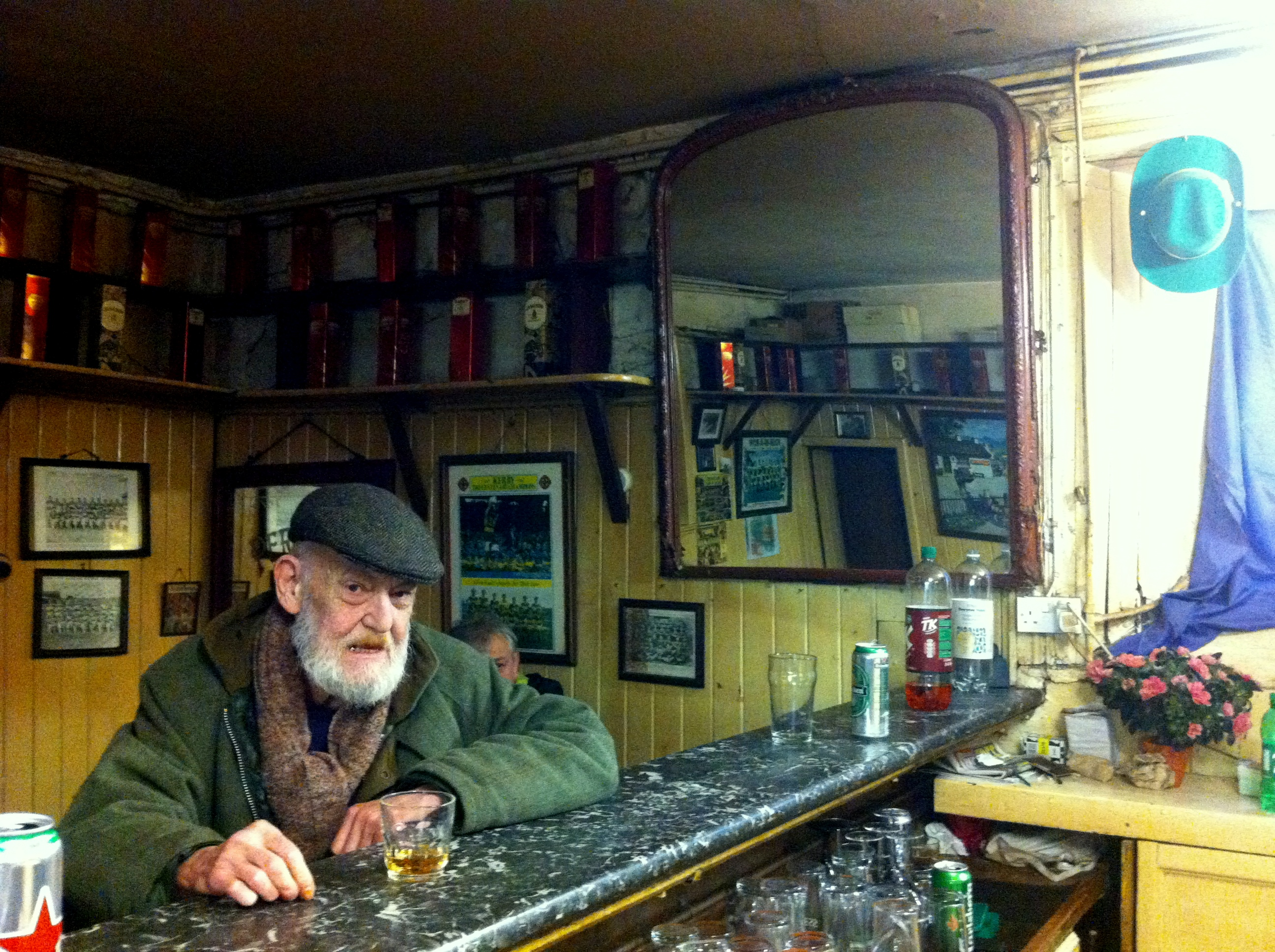
Doc Shiels in one of the "early bars:" John Reidy's in Killarney, Ireland, November 2015

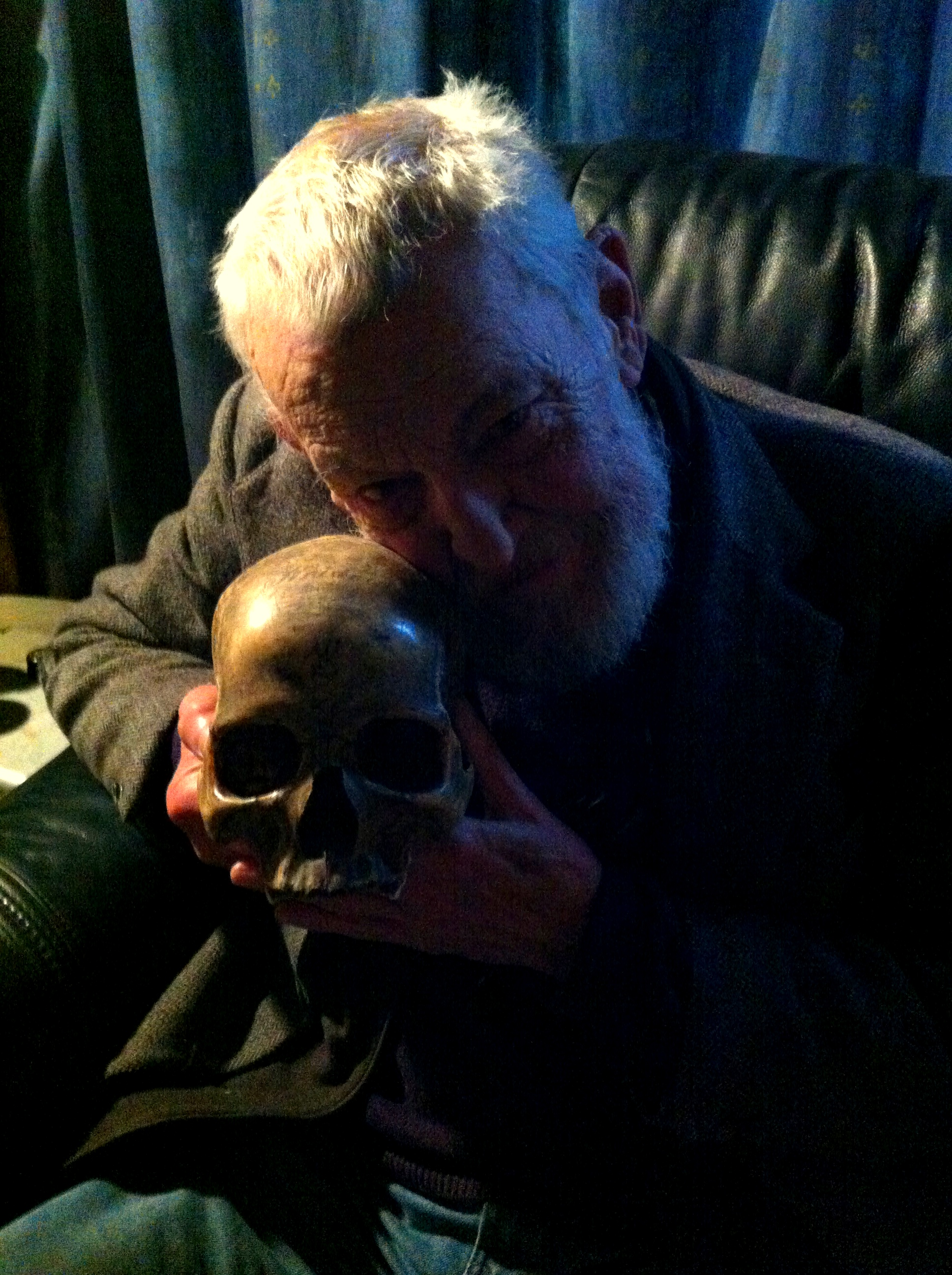
Doc Shiels with "Baby Winton", a skull

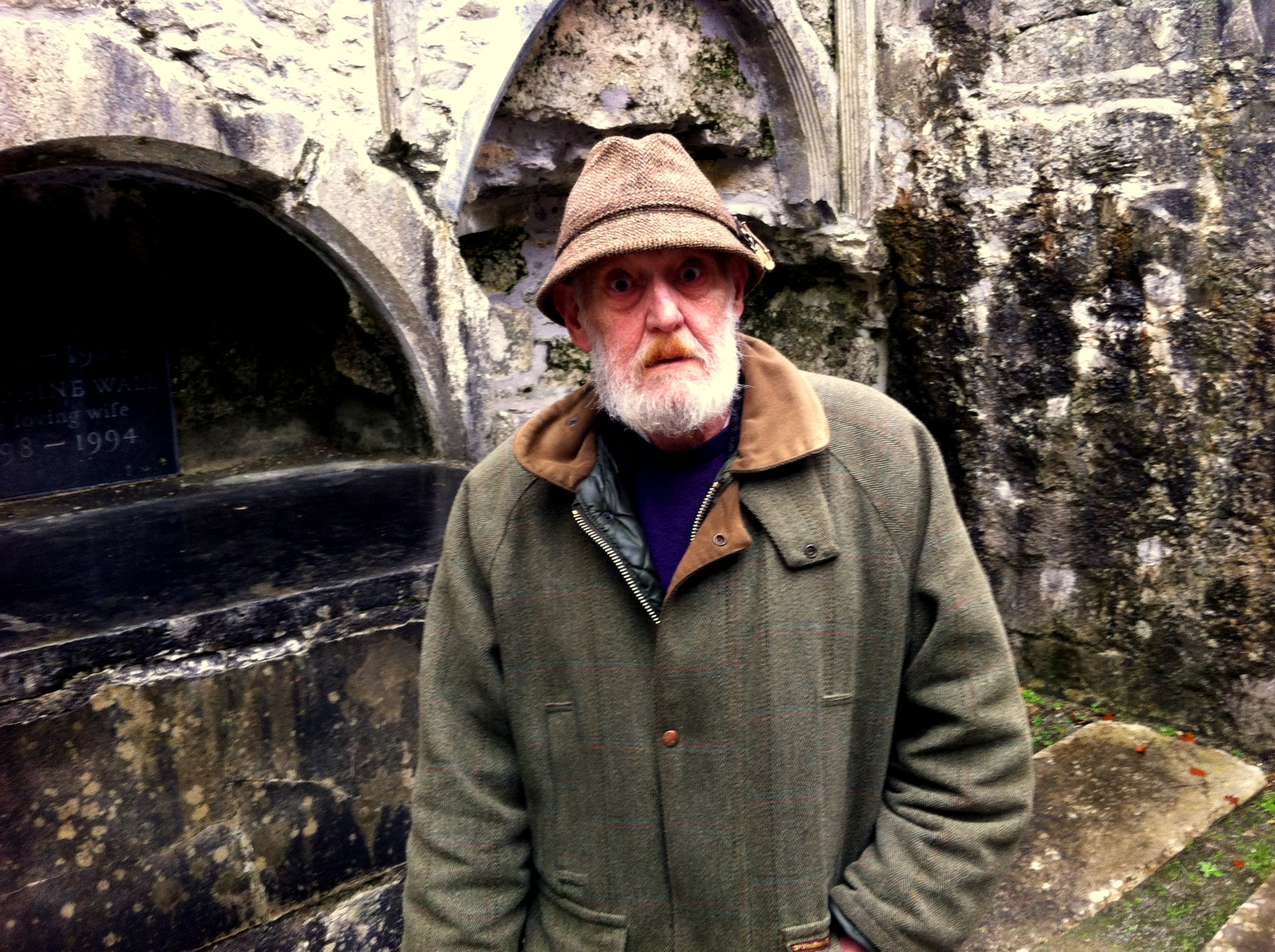
Exploring Muckross Abbey, Ireland, November 2015

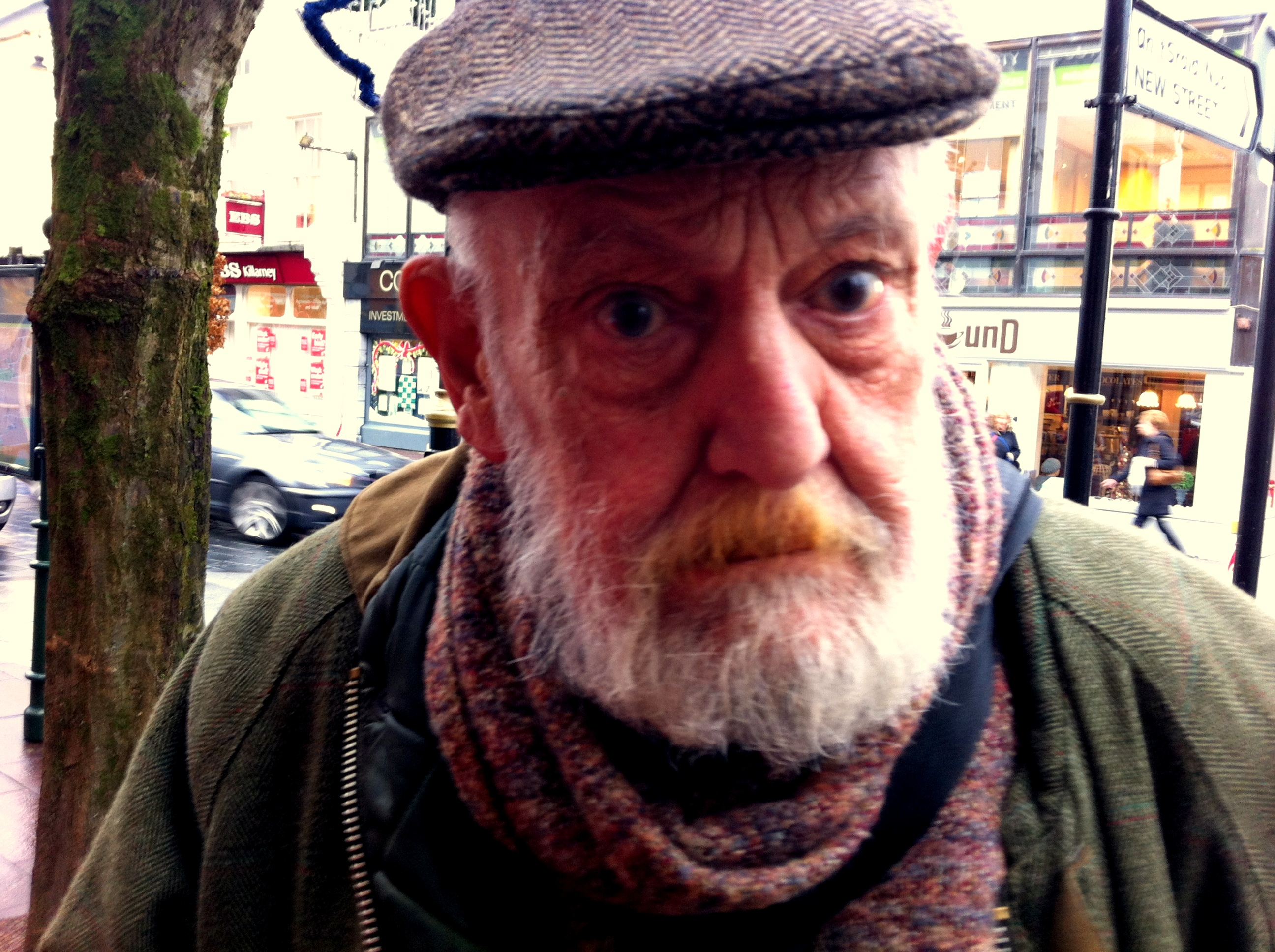
On the street in Killarney

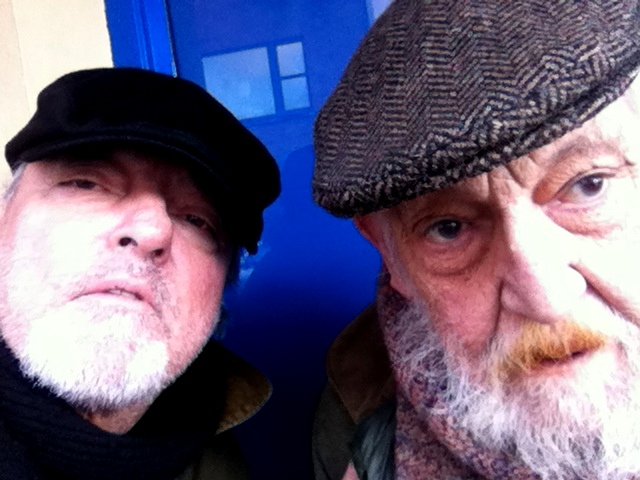
Mentalist Mark Edward and Shields in Killarney 2015

== Bibliography ==
- Steven Cousins, 1995, Tony Shiels, Mark Space Publications ISBN 187 1315 549
- Steven Cousins, 2000, Tony Shiels Retrospective: Paris, Ennis, St.Ives, Mark Space Publications, CD-ROM
- PJ. Field, 2009, Raw visions inside Cornwall, Apr issue pp. 48–9
- Rupert White, 2015, Monstermind: The magical life and art of Tony 'Doc' Shiels
- Rioult, Thibaut. ‘In Pursuit of the Marvellous: Surrealism, Tony Shiels’s Bizarre Magick and the Performative Turn’. European Journal of Theatre and Performance, no. 8 (December 2024): 108–59. https://doi.org/10.5281/zenodo.15016888.
