= Constant Hot Water =

1986 British TV series

- Genre: Sitcom
- Written by: Colin Pearson
- Directed by: Bernard Thompson
- Starring: Pat Phoenix; Prunella Gee
- Country of origin: United Kingdom
- Original language: English
- No. of series: 1
- No. of episodes: 6

Production
- Producer: Paula Burdon
- Running time: 25 minutes
- Production company: Central

Original release
- Network: ITV
- Release: 10 January – 14 February 1986

Constant Hot Water is a British sitcom written by Colin Pearson. Six episodes were broadcast from 10 January to 14 February 1986 on ITV. Every episode was broadcast on Friday nights at 8:30pm, and lasted 25 minutes.

== Synopsis ==
Constant Hot Water starred popular British actresses Pat Phoenix and Prunella Gee, who played rival landladies, Phyllis Nugent (Phoenix) and Miranda Thorpe (Gee), in the seaside town of Bridlington.

Busybody Phyllis, who is prim and proper, strongly objects to the arrival of glamorous widow Miranda, who has opened up her house next door as a rival B&B. All the men fancy Miranda, but Phyllis believes that she is a 'loose woman', and lowers the tone of the neighbourhood, even accusing her of running a brothel.

== Production ==
The hotel used for filming of the series was the Leeds House Guest House in Bridlington.

Constant Hot Water's theme song was provided by comedy musical cabaret group Instant Sunshine.

== Reception ==
The series was critically unsuccessful, and in 2003, it was number 6 in the list of the worst British sitcoms in the Radio Times Guide to TV Comedy.

However, the ratings, while not stellar, were over 9.3 million for each episode, and a second series was reputedly planned, though did not materialise. On an episode of Wogan (27 June 1986), star Pat Phoenix said that no matter what the critical response was, 'the public seemed to like it, and we are doing another series this autumn with new writers and a lot of new ideas in it.'

Constant Hot Water was never released on video, and it remains unreleased on DVD.

== Cast ==
- Pat Phoenix (billed as Patricia Phoenix) - Phyllis Nugent
- Prunella Gee - Miranda Thorpe
- Steve Alder - Frank Osbourne
- Roger Kemp - Norman Nugent
- Mohammed Ashiq (Ash Varrez) - Trevor
- Kevin Lloyd - Jeff
- Al Ashton - Brian
- Joe McPartland - Paddy
- Tricia Walsh-Smith - Linda

== Episodes ==
No.	Title	Original release date	Viewers (millions)	Chart
1	"Bed and Breakfast"	10 January 1986	11.12	25
2	"Sunday Lunch"	17 January 1986	10.01	37
3	"One Night in Portofino"	24 January 1986	9.6	44
4	"The Germans Are Coming"	31 January 1986	9.31	46
5	"Chef's Special"	7 February 1986	10.21	37
6	"Full House"	14 February 1986	9.66	44
