= Owlman =

Creature in Cornish folklore

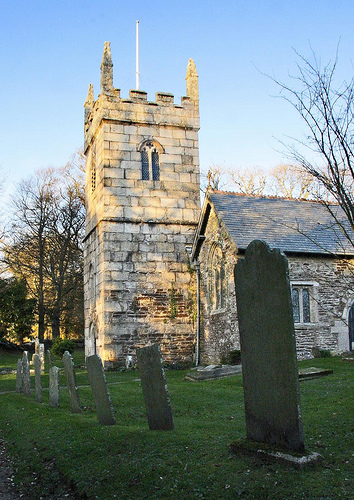
The church tower at Mawnan

In Cornish folklore, the Owlman (Cornish: Kowanden), also known as the Cornish Owlman or Owlman of Mawnan, is an owl-like humanoid creature reportedly sighted in 1976 in the village of Mawnan, Cornwall, United Kingdom. The reported sightings of the creature flying above the local church tower have been interpreted by some as misidentifications of a barn owl, a species known to nest in churches and similar structures.

== History ==
The story originated with Tony "Doc" Shiels, who had been involved in a series of "monster-raising" exploits in 1976. Shiels claimed to have investigated a report of two young girls on holiday in Mawnan who allegedly saw a large winged creature hovering above the tower of St Mawnan and St Stephen's Church, Mawnan on 17 April 1976. According to most versions of the story, the girls, identified as June and Vicky Melling, were reportedly frightened by their encounter with a large "feathered bird-man", prompting their father to cut short the family holiday after hearing their account. Shiels later reported that one of the girls provided him with a drawing of the creature, which he subsequently dubbed the "Owlman".

The story was subsequently recounted in a pamphlet entitled Morgawr: The Monster of Falmouth Bay, written by Anthony Mawnan-Peller and circulated throughout Cornwall in 1976. According to Shiels, the Owlman was reportedly encountered again on 3 July by two 14-year-old girls, Sally Chapman and Barbara Perry, who were already familiar with the story. The account states that the two girls were camping when they encountered a creature described as a "big owl with pointed ears, as big as a man", with glowing eyes and black, pincer-like claws.

Sporadic reports of the Owlman sightings in the vicinity of the church were recorded in 1978, 1979, 1989, and 1995. Local legend also holds that a "loud, owl-like sound" was heard at night in the Mullion churchyard in 2000.

== Explanation ==
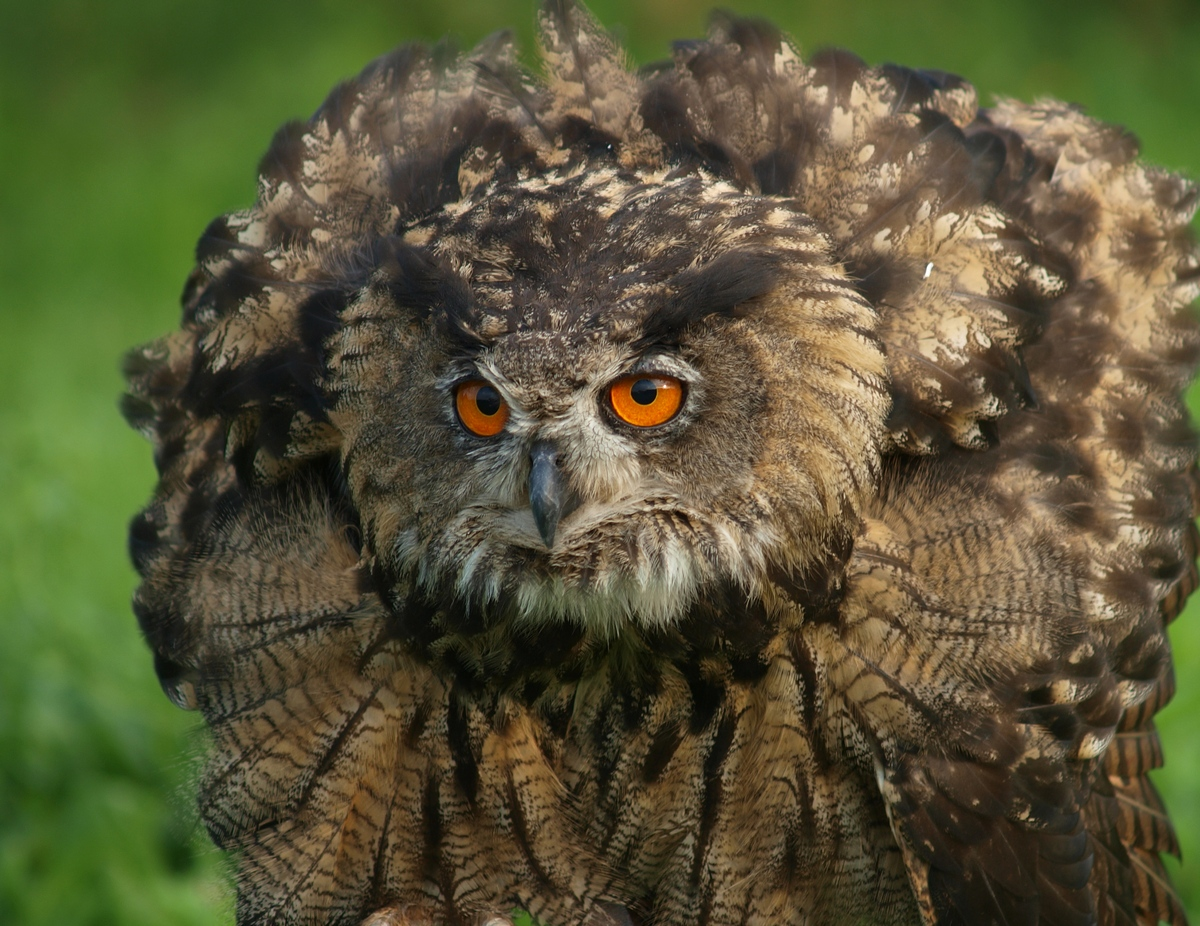
An eagle-owl

According to author Joe Nickell, church towers are common nesting places for barn owls, which he suggests may have been responsible for the reported sightings. Author and Fortean TV presenter Reverend Lionel Fanthorpe has instead proposed that the legend may have originated from a sighting of a Eurasian eagle-owl.

Occult historian Gareth Medway suggested that the entire story may have been a hoax perpetrated by Shiels, who had a reputation for similar exploits. Medway observed that witnesses who reported encounters with similar creatures promoted by Shiels were either directly associated with him or communicated their accounts exclusively to him, while others submitted descriptions of their alleged sightings to newspapers but were never subsequently interviewed.

== In popular culture ==
- In 2009, the episode "Death Raptor" focused on the Owlman in the Animal Planet TV series Lost Tapes.
- "The Owlman Feeds at Midnight" is an episode in Season 1 of the children's TV show The Secret Saturdays. The plot of the episode involves a town terrorised by an Owlman.
- Written by Carl Grose, the 2012 play Horse Piss for Blood features the Owlman as a key plot point.
- The Owlman is depicted in the 2013 Scottish independent horror film Lord of Tears. In this film, The Owlman represents the Semitic god Muloch.

== See also ==
- Eurasian eagle-owl
- Morgawr (folklore)
- Mothman
- Spring-heeled Jack

== Books ==
- Bord, Janet; Bord, Colin (1990). Alien Animals. Granada. (pp. 135–139, 141)
- Downes, Jonathan (1997). The Owlman and Others. Corby: Domra Publications. p. 239. ISBN 0-9524417-6-4.
- McEwan, Graham J. (1986). Mystery Animals of Britain and Ireland. London: Robert Hale. p. 224. ISBN 0-7090-2801-6. (pp. 150–153)
