= Moving (British TV series) =

1985 British television series

- Genre: Sitcom
- Starring: Penelope Keith; Ronald Pickup; Prunella Gee; David Ashford; Eliza Hunt; Roger Lloyd-Pack
- Country of origin: United Kingdom
- No. of series: 1
- No. of episodes: 6

Production
- Running time: 35 minutes
- Production company: Thames Television

Original release
- Network: ITV
- Release: 9 January – 13 February 1985

Moving is a British sitcom that aired on ITV in 1985. It stars Penelope Keith and was written by Stanley Price. It was made for the ITV network by Thames Television.

== Background ==
Stanley Price adapted Moving from a comedy play of the same name he had written. The play had enjoyed a successful run in London. Unusually for a sitcom, Moving was recorded without a studio audience. The six episodes were later edited into a 90-minute programme and shown on 2 September 1987.

== Cast ==
- Penelope Keith – Sarah Gladwyn
- Ronald Pickup – Frank Gladwyn
- Prunella Gee – Liz Ford
- David Ashford – Bill Lomax
- Eliza Hunt – Beryl Fearnley
- Roger Lloyd-Pack – Jimmy Ryan
- Natalie Slater – Eileen Lewis
- Barbara Wilshere – Jane Gladwyn

== Plot ==
Now that their children have grown up and left home, Sarah and Frank Gladwyn are alone in their large family home. However, when they decide to move Sarah insists on selling it to "the right person". However, things soon start to go wrong, and their daughter Jane also returns from college. Meanwhile, Sarah's sister Liz Ford is taking Valium.

== Episodes ==
1. Episode One (9 January 1985)
2. Episode Two (16 January 1985)
3. Episode Three (23 January 1985)
4. Episode Four (30 January 1985)
5. Episode Five (6 February 1985)
6. Episode Six (13 February 1985)
