= Alan Rothwell =

British actor (1937–2026)

- Rothwell on Coronation Street in the 1960s
- Born: 9 February 1937; Oldham, Lancashire, England
- Died: 14 May 2026 (aged 89); Lancashire, England
- Occupations: Actor; television presenter
- Years active: 1957–2021
- Notable work: Coronation Street; Top Secret; Brookside
- Spouses: Marjorie Ward (m. 1961; div. 1967) Maureen Hayden (m. 1967; div. 1999)
- Children: 2

Alan Rothwell (9 February 1937 – 14 May 2026) was an English actor. He played David Barlow in the ITV soap opera Coronation Street as a regular from 1960 to 1961, and again from 1963 to 1968, and Nicholas Black in Brookside between 1985 and 1986. His other acting credits include playing Mike in Top Secret (1961–1962), a recurring role in Heartbeat (1994–1995), and various roles in Doctors (2004–2016). He also presented the children's television series Picture Box and Hickory House.

== Life and career ==
Rothwell was born in Oldham, Lancashire, on 9 February 1937. He became a professional actor and appeared frequently on BBC Radio's Children's Hour. He worked in local rep theatre at this time. He studied at RADA in London and then completed his National Service. He first came to fame playing the character Jimmy Grange in The Archers, then David Barlow in the then new ITV soap opera Coronation Street as a regular from December 1960 until June 1961, then appeared for two episodes in June 1963, before returning as a regular from December 1964 to April 1968. The character was killed off off-screen two years later. He also featured as a regular character in all 26 episodes of the 1961–1962 British spy series Top Secret in the role of Mike. He was a guest star in Gideon's Way 1964 as a young man wrongly accused of killing his girlfriend played by Carol White. He also had roles in the rediscovered 1960 film Linda, also starring Carol White, and the 1971 film Zeppelin, starring Michael York and Elke Sommer.

Rothwell then became known as a presenter to a generation of children, appearing on the children's television programmes Picture Box from 1969 to 1989 and Hickory House from 1973 to 1978.

Rothwell returned to soap operas in 1985, this time portraying the heroin addict Nicholas Black in Brookside. In 2002, he appeared in the television drama film Shipman. He also played Gerry Stringer in all six episodes of Dead Man Weds in 2005. Among his many other television credits are parts in Casualty, Emmerdale, Heartbeat, Doctors, Shameless and Bedlam, A Song For Jenny, (BBC 2015), Rovers, (Jellylegs, 2016). In 2004, Rothwell guest-starred in the Doctor Who audio adventure The Twilight Kingdom.

In 2015, Rothwell appeared as a villager in the BBC TV series The Musketeers episode 2.5 "The Return". In 2018, Rothwell appeared as Douglas in 20th Century-Fox's British comedy Walk Like A Panther, released in cinemas 9 March of that year.

== Death ==
Rothwell died following a short illness on 14 May 2026, at the age of 89. His death was announced by the Coronation Street social media team. William Roache, who portrayed his on-screen brother Ken Barlow in the soap, paid tribute and said he was "very sorry to hear of Alan's passing. He and I worked together on the very first episodes of Coronation Street, which was such a wonderful time. I got to know him well over the years; he was a very good actor and a delightful man."

== Filmography ==
=== Television ===
Year	Title	Character	Notes
1960–1961, 1963–1968	Coronation Street	David Barlow	Regular role; 251 episodes
1961–1962	Top Secret	Mike	Regular role; 26 episodes
1961	Citizen James	Ron	Episode: "Teenagers"
1963	Z-Cars	Eddie Cross	Episode: "Lucky Accident"
1964	Sergeant Cork	Mr. Carney	Episode: "The Case of the Stricken Surgeon"
1964	Gideon's Way	Bill Rose	Episode: "The Rhyme and the Reason"
1968–1989	Picture Box	Self	Presenter
1973–1977	Hickory House	Self	Presenter
1985	Brookside	Community lawyer	
1985–1986	Brookside	Nicholas Black	Regular role; 56 episodes
1988	All Creatures Great and Small	Hubert Merrick	Episode: "For Richer, for Poorer"
1992	Watching	Vicar	Episode: "Christening"
1992	Medics	Examiner	
1993	Emmerdale	Judge	2 episodes
1994–1995	Heartbeat	Reverend Jackson	5 episodes
1997–1998	Emmerdale	John Kenyon	7 episodes
1998–1999	Casualty	Anthony Rafferty	2 episodes
1999–2000	Wilmot	Mr. Ronson	Regular role; 13 episodes
2000	Queer as Folk	Dudley Jackson	Episode: "Out of the Closet, Into the Fire"
2005	Fat Friends	Stanley	Episode: "Angel's Delight"-
2005	Dead Man Weds	Gerry Stringer	Regular role; 6 Episodes
2011	Casualty	Bernard Jones	Episode: "Next of Kin: Part 2"
2012–2013	Starlings	Brian Valentine	5 episodes
2015	Casualty	Henry Chalmers	Episode: "Clinging On"
2015	The Musketeers	Villager	Episode: "The Return"
2016	Rovers	Stanley Bell	Episode: "The Anniversary"
