= Morgawr (folklore) =

Purported Cornish sea serpent

In Cornish folklore, the Morgawr (Cornish: Morgowr, meaning sea giant) is a sea serpent that purportedly inhabits the waters near Falmouth Bay, Cornwall, England, but an academic article in 2022 asserts that the story began as a hoax.

== History ==
According to legend, the creature first appeared near Pendennis Point in 1975, described as having a trunk with a very long neck and black or brown skin "like a sea lion's". Local mackerel fishermen reportedly blamed bad weather and poor fishing on supposed sightings of the monster. Some versions of the story say the monster appeared after German submarine U28 torpedoed a British merchant ship during World War I, and describe it as 60 feet (18 m) long, shaped like a crocodile with four webbed feet, and possessing a powerful tail.

Folklorists speculate that Cornish author Tony "Doc" Shiels "invented" the creature as a hoax, having coined the name "Morgawr" after claiming to sight it in 1976. According to the story, Shiels sent the Falmouth Packet newspaper photographs of the monster attributed to an anonymous individual called "Mary F". The same year in July, fishermen John Cock and George Vinnicombe claimed to have sighted the creature in the waters off Lizard Point. Also in 1976, Shiels claimed to have photographed the creature lying low in the water near Mawnan. According to some anecdotes, British writer Sheila Bird claimed to have seen the monster while walking the cliffs of Gerrans Bay in 1985.

The legend continues to the present day with sporadic claims of Morgawr sightings on the stretch of coastline between Rosemullion Head and Toll Point, popularly known as "Morgawr's Mile".

== In popular culture ==
- The Morgow Rises! is a horror novel by Cornish author Peter Tremayne featuring a sea serpent named "The Morgow".
- A serpent named "Morgawrus" that appears in A Warlock in Whitby by Robin Jarvis was reportedly inspired by the legend.
- A race of cancerous and mutated sea-serpent men called the Morgawr are a playable faction in the 4X strategy game Endless Legend.
- A three part reel in D Mixolydian called Morgawr was written by Simon Owen of Llanelli and Oxford, and performed by the band Pencerdd.
- A creature called "Morgawr" appears in the Shadowbringers expansion of the popular fantasy MMORPG Final Fantasy XIV in "The Tempest" zone.

== Boat name ==
The Falmouth-made reproduction of the Ferriby Boats was named Morgawr after the legendary beast.

== See also ==
- Owlman
- Beast of Bodmin
- List of cryptids
