= Showstopper! The Improvised Musical =

Improvised musical theatre comedy show

Showstopper! The Improvised Musical is an improvised comedy, musical theatre show founded in London in 2008. It has toured the UK extensively, usually sells out at the Edinburgh Festival Fringe every year, had its own BBC Radio 4 series in 2011 and performed a 10-week run in London's West End in 2015, for which it won an Olivier Award.

The idea of the show was conceived at a workshop that two of the creators attended in London. The objective of the show is to improvise a musical based on suggestions from the audience. The audience provides the show setting, title and several musicals or musical theatre composers whose styles are then pastiched in the show.

It is chaired by Dylan Emery and Sean McCann and stars Jonathan Ainscough, Ruth Bratt, Justin Brett, Matt Cavendish, Joshua Jackson, Ali James, Pippa Evans, Susan Harrison, Adam Meggido, Philip Pellew, Andrew David Pugsley, Lauren Shearing, and Lucy Trodd as the core cast of comic actors. The core musicians are Duncan Walsh Atkins (keyboards - also musical director), Chris Ash (keyboards, reeds and deputy musical director) and Alex Freeman (percussion). The technical director (who also improvises the lighting) is Damian Robertson. The directors are Adam Meggido and Dylan Emery.

After making a debut at the Edinburgh Festival in 2008, the show began a residency at the Kings Head Theatre before transferring to The Drill Hall. It has toured the UK, Ireland, Singapore, Canada, India, Belgium, Italy and Hong Kong, and in 2011 had a series of 30-minute shows for BBC Radio Four. From 2011 the show started a series of one-off nights at the Ambassadors Theatre (London) and the Criterion in London's West End. Then in September 2015, it opened at the Apollo Theatre (Shaftesbury avenue) for a limited run of 10 weeks. After the run, it continued with a series of one-off nights at the Lyric Theatre (also Shaftesbury avenue), The Other Palace Theatre and since May 22nd 2023, has been at the Cambridge Theatre.

The show has occasionally featured guest performers, including the British comic actor Matt Lucas, Mike McShane, Channel 4 newscaster John Snow, Nicolas Parsons, Jim Bowen, radical vicar and peacemaker Donald Reeves, actor and singer Keith Jack, a cappella group The Magnets and others.

It has received several industry awards including the 2009 Mervyn Stutter Spirit of the Fringe Award and in 2016 won the Olivier Award for best entertainment and family show.

The theatre troupe responsible for Showstopper! The Improvised Musical is called The Showstoppers (The Showstoppers – The Improvised Musical). They also have a children's show called The Showstoppers' Kids Show.

The show was created by Adam Meggido and Dylan Emery with the backing of Keith Strachan and all three continue to run the show. The show has had two general managers - James Seabright (Seabright Productions) then Suzanna Rosenthal (Something for the Weekend). Seabright came back to produce the West End run.
