= Del Henney =

English actor (1935–2019)

- Born: 24 July 1935; Liverpool, Lancashire, England
- Died: 14 January 2019 (aged 83)
- Occupation: Actor

Joseph Derek "Del" Henney (24 July 1935 – 14 January 2019) was a British actor.

== Early life ==
Joseph Derek Henney was born in Liverpool in 1935. After an education at the Liverpool Collegiate School, Henney served in the British Army and graduated from RADA in 1965.

== Career ==
=== Film ===
Henney's film roles included Charlie Venner in Sam Peckinpah's Straw Dogs (1971). In addition to stage and film work, he appeared in numerous television productions.

=== Television ===
Henney appeared as characters in numerous British television series such as Eddie Boyse, a career criminal in The Sweeney episode Jigsaw (1975); as Sergeant Hollywake a member of the Royal Flying Corps in the Wings episode Zeppelin (1978) and as Harold Jackson in the Heartbeat episode Changing Places (1992).

== Filmography ==
=== Film ===
- When Eight Bells Toll (1971) – Dungeon Guard
- Villain (1971) – Webb
- Straw Dogs (1971) – Charlie Venner
- Brannigan (1975) – Drexel
- Joseph Andrews (1977) – Didapper's Valet
- Soldier of Orange (1977) – Sergeant
- Swing (1999) – Colin
- Going Off Big Time (2000) – George Hannassey
- Devil's Playground (2010) – Dr. Michael Brooke

=== Television ===
- Coronation Street (1971) – Eddie Duncan
- The Sweeney (1975, TV Series) – Eddie Boyse
- Fallen Hero (1978–1979, TV Series) – Gareth Hopkins
- The Professionals (1978–1983, TV Series) – Quinn / Benny Marsh
- Juliet Bravo (1980–1984, TV Series) – Derrick Williams / Pat Garfield / Detective Sergeant Gordon Cole
- Doctor Who – Resurrection of the Daleks (1984, TV Series) – Colonel Archer
- A Woman of Substance (1985, TV Mini-Series) – Jack Harte
- Minder (1989, TV Series) – Tombo
- Heartbeat (1992, TV Series) – Harold Jackson
- Liverpool 1 (1999, TV Series) – Mr Mackie
