= People and Places =

Canadian children's television series

- Genre: children's
- Presented by: Rex Loring
- Country of origin: Canada
- Original language: English
- No. of seasons: 1

Production
- Running time: 15 minutes

Original release
- Network: CBC Television
- Release: 5 October 1961 – 12 October 1962

People and Places is a Canadian children's television series that aired on CBC Television from 1961 to 1962.

== Premise ==
The series featured film and studio segments for children on topics such as camping, geography, puppets and writing.

== Scheduling ==
This 15-minute series was broadcast Thursdays at 3:30 a.m. (Eastern) from 5 October to 28 December 1961. Some episodes were rebroadcast in October 1962.
