= Adam Meggido =

English actor, director, writer and teacher

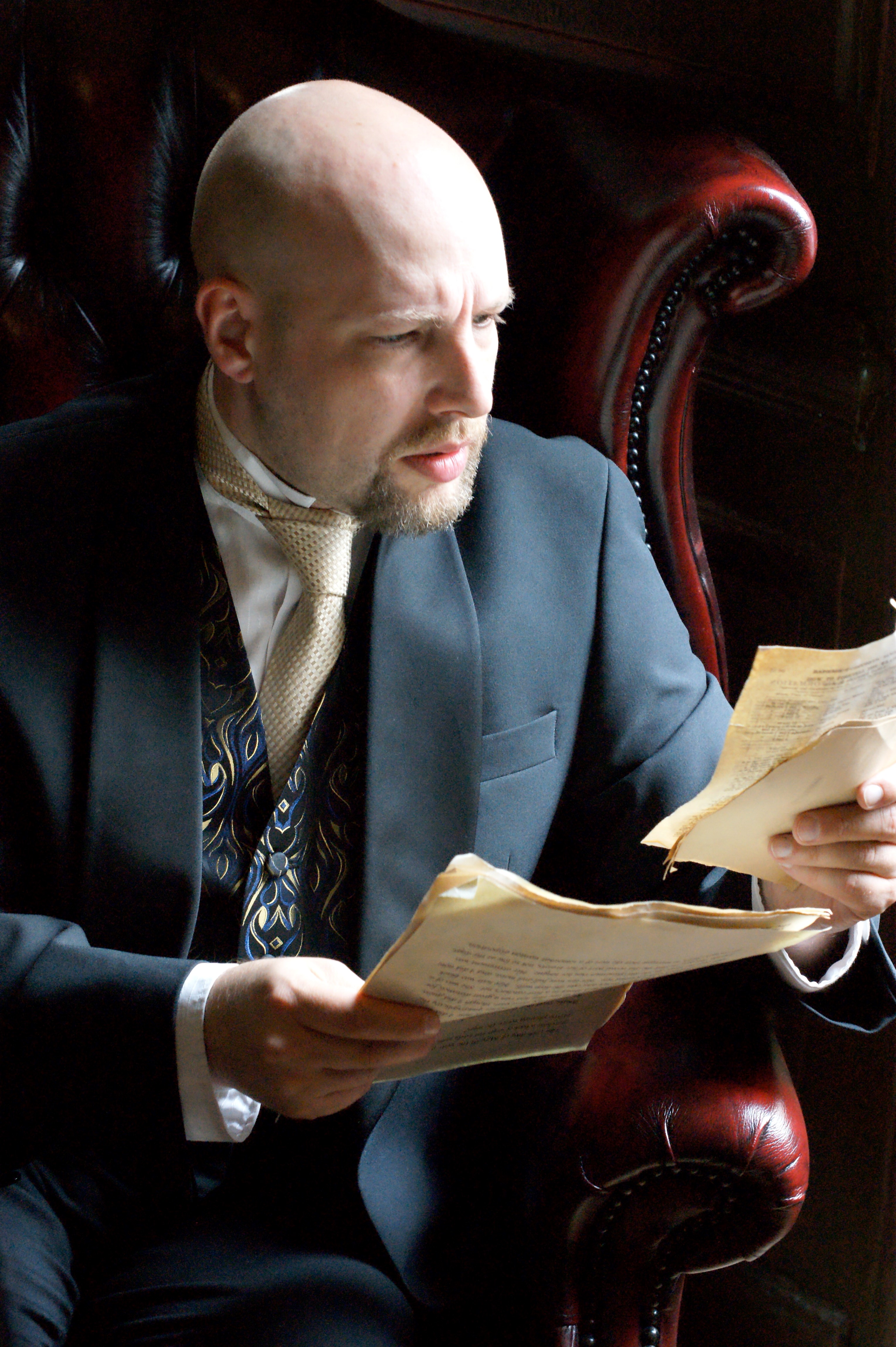
Meggido in The Society Of Strange

Adam Meggido is an English actor, director, writer and teacher. He is best known for co-creating and directing Showstopper! The Improvised Musical.

== Biography ==
Meggido has taught at LAMDA since 2004, serving as Head of Foundation from 2007 to 2016. He has also taught at Birmingham University, the University of Alberta, Mountview Theatre School, Italia Conti, the London School of Dramatic Art and the London Film School.

== Works ==
He is the director of Peter Pan Goes Wrong and consultant director on Mischief Movie Night, both made for the Mischief Theater. His play Boris the Third, staged at the Edinburgh Fringe in 2022, which imagined Boris Johnson's performance in his school production of Richard III – "the tale of a leader’s ruthless ambition, cynical skullduggery and brash mendacity as his country is gripped by crisis".

=== Writing ===
He is also the author of Improv Beyond Rules. According to reviewer Chris Whyld, it sets out a simple formula: "Listen. Accept. Commit – these are the three guiding principles which permeate all of Meggido's ideas and techniques."
