= Split Ends (British TV series) =

- Genre: Sitcom
- Written by: Len Richmond
- Directed by: Alan J. W. Bell
- Starring: Anita Dobson; Peter Blake; Harry Ditson; Barbara New; Nimmy March; Robin Davies; Lee Whitlock
- Country of origin: United Kingdom
- Original language: English
- No. of series: 1
- No. of episodes: 6

Production
- Producer: James Maw
- Running time: 30 minutes
- Production company: Granada Television

Original release
- Network: ITV
- Release: 7 June – 12 July 1989

Split Ends is a British sitcom made by Granada Television. It ran for one series on ITV between 7 June and 12 July 1989. It was written by Len Richmond and directed by Alan J. W. Bell.

Cath (played by Anita Dobson) is a woman in her thirties who runs a hairdresser's shop. Each episode sees Cath trying to decide if she wants to be with Clint (Harry Ditson) or David (Peter Blake). The series also features Barbara New and Nimmy March in supporting roles.

== Episodes ==
- Head Over Heels (7 June 1989)
- Parting of the Waves (14 June 1989)
- Crew Cuts (21 June 1989)
- Tangles (28 June 1989)
- The Brush Off (5 July 1989)
- Hair Today (12 July 1989)
