= Institute of Phenomenological Studies =

The Institute of Phenomenological Studies was founded in London in 1966 by a group of radical psychiatrists involved with Kingsley Hall. They went on to play a major tole in the Dialectics of Liberation Congress. The group was composed of Dr. Joseph Berke, Dr. David Cooper, Dr. John Heaton,Dr. Ronald Laing, Dr. Leon Redler, and Dr. Paul Senft. According to a flyer from issued they had already expanded the scope of psychiatry to involved philosophical and sociological problematics. Emphasising a phenomenological approach they sought "a maximal clarification of our field of experience aside from those preconceptual schemata that would be imposed on us by certain rigid systems of knowledge. This project means that we attempt to clear the field of our vision of all manner of socially convenient academic convention.”

The institute developed an experimental practice using self-organised forms of education. It was a response to what the founders considered to be a rigid intellectualism which had exhausted the spiritual aspects of established academic structures. Their courses, departing from conventional curricula, were intended to create innovative environments where thought could develop outside and beyond institutional constraints.

Alongside the Committee on Research Development of Oberlin College, the institute gave financial support to Joseph Berke and Calvin Hernton for the research published as The Cannabis Experience: An Interpretative Study of the Effects of Marijuana and Hashish (London: Peter Owen, 1974).
