= The Politics of Experience and The Bird of Paradise =

1967 book by R. D. Laing

The Politics of Experience
- Author: R. D. Laing
- Language: English
- Publisher: Penguin Books
- Publication date: 1967
- Publication place: United Kingdom
- Media type: Print (Paperback)
- Pages: 156
- ISBN: 978-0-14-002572-9
- OCLC: 954582

The Politics of Experience and The Bird of Paradise is a 1967 book by the Scottish psychiatrist R. D. Laing. The book comprises two parts – the first a collection of seven articles previously published between 1962 and 1965, the second a free-flowing quasi-autobiographical piece of poetry and prose.

== Background ==
The Politics of Experience and The Bird of Paradise was inspired in part by Laing’s extensive experimentation with LSD; but also owes a debt to authors such as the anthropologist Gregory Bateson and the philosopher Jean-Paul Sartre.

== Summary ==
Laing examines the nature of human experience from a phenomenological point of view, as well as the possibilities for psychotherapy in an existentially distorted world. He challenges the idea of normality in modern society, and argues that it is not merely people who are mad, but the world as well. He presents psychosis as "a psychedelic voyage of discovery in which the boundaries of perception were widened, and consciousness expanded".

While accepting in principle that "There is no need to idealize someone just because he is labelled 'out of formation'" (or mad), Laing tended to confirm a view of the mad as explorers of the inner world.

== Influence ==
The Politics of Experience is Laing's best known book, its literary influence being especially apparent in Doris Lessing's novel, Briefing for a Descent into Hell (1971).

=== Spencer-Brown ===
G. Spencer-Brown cites to the book in the Laws of Form in a passage in the introduction, dated August 1967 shortly after the Dialectics of Liberation Congress (15 and 30 July 1967). Spencer-Brown notes Laing's critique of the use of the term "data" - that which is 'given' - are in fact taken from a "constantly elusive matrix of happening." Laing suggested "capta" would be a better term.

== See also ==
- Aaron Esterson
- David Cooper
- Philadelphia Association
- Psychedelia
- Social alienation
