= Ironsand =

Sand with high concentrations of iron

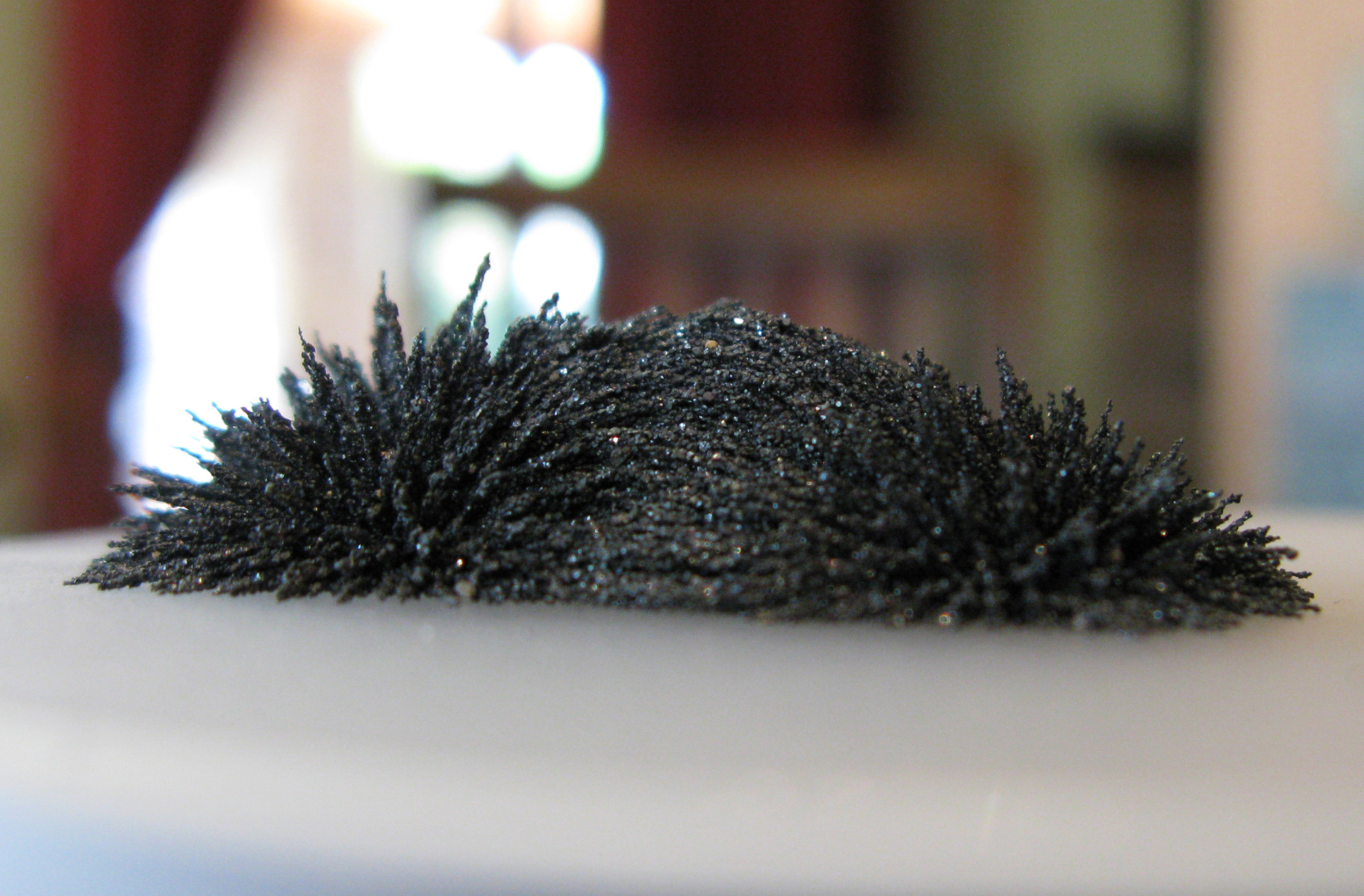
Iron sand from Phoenix, Arizona, attracted to a magnet

Ironsand, also known as iron-sand or iron sand, is a type of sand with heavy concentrations of iron. It is typically dark grey or blackish in color.

It is composed mainly of magnetite, Fe_{3}O_{4}, and also contains small amounts of titanium, silica, manganese, calcium and vanadium.

Ironsand has a tendency to heat up in direct sunlight, causing temperatures high enough to cause minor burns. As such it forms a hazard in New Zealand at popular west-coast surf beaches such as Piha.

== Occurrence ==
Ironsand is found worldwide. Although the iron mineral composition of the ironsand is mostly magnetite, the sand is usually mixed with other types of sand that wash downriver or ashore from mountainous or underwater deposits. The exact composition of the sand mixture may vary drastically even in the same geographic region. In some areas the sand may contain mostly quartz, while in others the sand may be made primarily from volcanic rock such as basalt, depending on the types of minerals along the water's path. The ironsand is typically picked up along the way from beds, veins, or inclusions of magnetite, which may originate a great distance from the sand deposits, and washed downstream or along the currents with the rest of the sand. Being heavier than the other sands, it is often deposited in areas where the water experiences a sudden change in direction or speed, such as the widening of a river or where the waves ebb and flow against the shoreline.

The ironsand is mixed with the other sands as small grains of black or dark-blue magnetite. Sand used for mining typically had anywhere from 19% magnetite to as low as 2%. The ironsand typically had to be separated from the sand mixture. Because the magnetite is usually heavier than quartz, feldspar, or other minerals, separation was usually done by washing it in sluice boxes (a method similar to gold panning but on a larger scale). Sluice separation typically yielded concentrations of magnetite ranging from 30 to 50%, depending on the type of sand and the method used. In the early 20th century a process of magnetic separation was developed that could produce concentrations as high as 70%. Once concentrated, the magnetite grains could then be smelted into various forms of iron. However, the loose, granular nature of the ore was difficult to keep contained in common bloomeries or blast furnaces, having a tendency toward granular flow (mimicking a liquid at larger scales) and was easily blown away by the bellow blasts, so was impossible to process using common methods of iron or steel production. Thus, innovative methods of smelting the ore were developed. The magnetite grains, however, often contain other metal impurities, such as chromium, arsenic, or titanium. Due to the nature of the sand, the mining operations were rarely stationary, but frequently moved from place to place.

=== Asia ===
Historically, ironsand was predominantly used in East Asian cultures; most notably in China and Japan.

==== China ====
Ironsand had moderate, localized uses in China during the late Industrial Revolution, but was a rather unimportant commodity throughout the long history of the Chinese iron-industry. Unlike the rest of Eurasia and Africa, there is very little archeological evidence to suggest that bloomery smelting was used in ancient China. The Chinese countryside was rich in deposits that contained both coal, a fuel that burns at a high temperature, and an iron ore containing a high content of phosphorus. Around 1200 BCE the Chinese developed a method of smelting the rocky ore into pig iron, which was then remelted and poured into molds (cast) to form cast iron. Although the metal was very brittle, this method was able to produce iron in much greater volumes than bloomery smelting, and with vastly higher yields of metal per ore. By the 1st century BCE the Chinese iron-industry was by far the largest and most advanced in the world. By the 1st century AD they had developed puddling for the production of mild steel, crucible steel for the manufacture of swords and other weapons, and a chemical process of rapidly decarburizing liquid pig-iron to make wrought iron, using the oxidation properties of saltpeter (called the Heaton process, it was independently discovered by John Heaton in the 1860s). China remained the world's largest producer of iron until the 11th century, manufacturing large quantities of relatively affordable steel and iron.

Donald B Wagner, an expert in ancient Chinese metallurgy, notes that attempts to trace the history of ironsand in China end with inconclusive results. One source may indicate its use as early as the Tang Dynasty (~700-900 CE) while others seem to contradict this interpretation. Due to wars, invasions, famines, distrust of the government, overpopulation, a rising opium epidemic, and clashes between various tongs of miners, very little information exists about the industry during the 19th century, when a European miner named Felix Tegengren arrived to find the Chinese industry in shambles. Tegengren notes that ironsand was sluice mined in Henan and Fujian by local farmers and smelted over charcoal fires to make tools, but it involved a lot of work, which made it very expensive. It was only smelted where there was enough wood for the fires and cheaper steel was not readily available. Therefore, the material was considered to be economically unimportant in China. However, because the mining was safe, outdoor work, it was practiced by local farmers to supplement their income wherever it was available; in the 19th century 1,000 lb (450 kg) of sluiced sand typically sold for the equivalent of 50 to 60 US dollars (by 2016 exchange rates ~ 900–1000 dollars or 700–800 euros).

However, in the modern age ironsand is placer mined along China's southeast coast and used for smelting steel. The typical composition of this ironsand is 48.88% metallic iron, 25.84% silica, 0.232% phosphorus, and 0.052% sulfur.

==== Indonesia ====
In Indonesia, iron sand is prevalent on the south coast of Java island.

==== Japan ====
Large scale mining was not practiced in Japan until the 7th or 8th centuries. Prior to this, metals were commonly imported into Japan from China and Korea. Deposits of iron ore are thought to have been scarce in Japan, so, around the 8th century, iron-making technology developed with the use of ironsand (satetsu) as the raw ingredient. Because of the loose nature of the sand, it is difficult to smelt in a normal bloomery, or to use in a blast furnace to make pig iron, so the Japanese developed an open-topped bloomery called a tatara. The tatara was built with a low, tub-like shape, resembling a horizontal blast-furnace, into which ironsand could be poured and contained, and smelted in stages. Unlike with other methods, the charcoal was piled on top of the sand and smelted from above, keeping it from being blown about by the blasts from the bellows. Instead of brick or stone, the tatara was made of clay so that it could simply be broken apart to extract the metal bloom. This method allowed smelting of much higher volumes of ore than other types of bloomery smelting.

The ironsand in Japan comes in two forms. Masa ironsand is found mixed with quartz sand that washes down from granite mountains. The magnetite in the sand contains few impurities or other metal oxides. Masa ironsand was used for manufacturing wrought iron and steel, used in everything from tools to cookware. Ironsand was used extensively in Japan for iron production, especially for traditional Japanese swords. Akome ironsand is found mixed with sand made from an igneous rock called diorite. The magnetite in the sand contains often greater than 5% titanium dioxide, which lowers the smelting temperature. The akome ironsand is used in the tatara to make pig iron, which is then used to make items out of cast iron (nabegane). In the manufacture of steel, the akome was added to the tatara during the initial stage of smelting, acting as a binder and catalyst for steel production, upon which the masa ironsand was poured during further stages. When smelted for pig iron, 1,000 lb (450 kg) or 120 kanme) typically yielded about 200 lb (91 kg) of pig iron, 20 lb (9.1 kg) of steel, and 70 lb (32 kg) of slag. When smelted for steel, 1,000 lb (450 kg) of sand yielded about 100 lb (45 kg) of steel, 100 lb (45 kg) of slag, and 90 lb (41 kg) of pig iron. Slag and pig iron that were not suitable for use were then melted together to form wrought iron, of which 1,000 lb (450 kg) mixed produced about 500 lb (230 kg) of iron.

=== Europe ===
Ironsand is found many places in Europe, although it was rarely used for smelting. It is often found in association with volcanic or basaltic sands. For example, it is found in Tenerife, Spain, where the magnetite grains contain a very high amount of titanium and other impurities. The typical composition is 79.2% iron oxide, 14.6% titanium dioxide, 1.6% manganese oxide, 0.8% silica and aluminum oxide, and trace amounts of chromium. It can also be found in the River Dee, in Aberdeenshire, Scotland, containing 85.3% iron oxide, 9.5% titanium dioxide, 1.0% arsenic, and 1.5% silica and aluminum oxide.

=== New Zealand ===
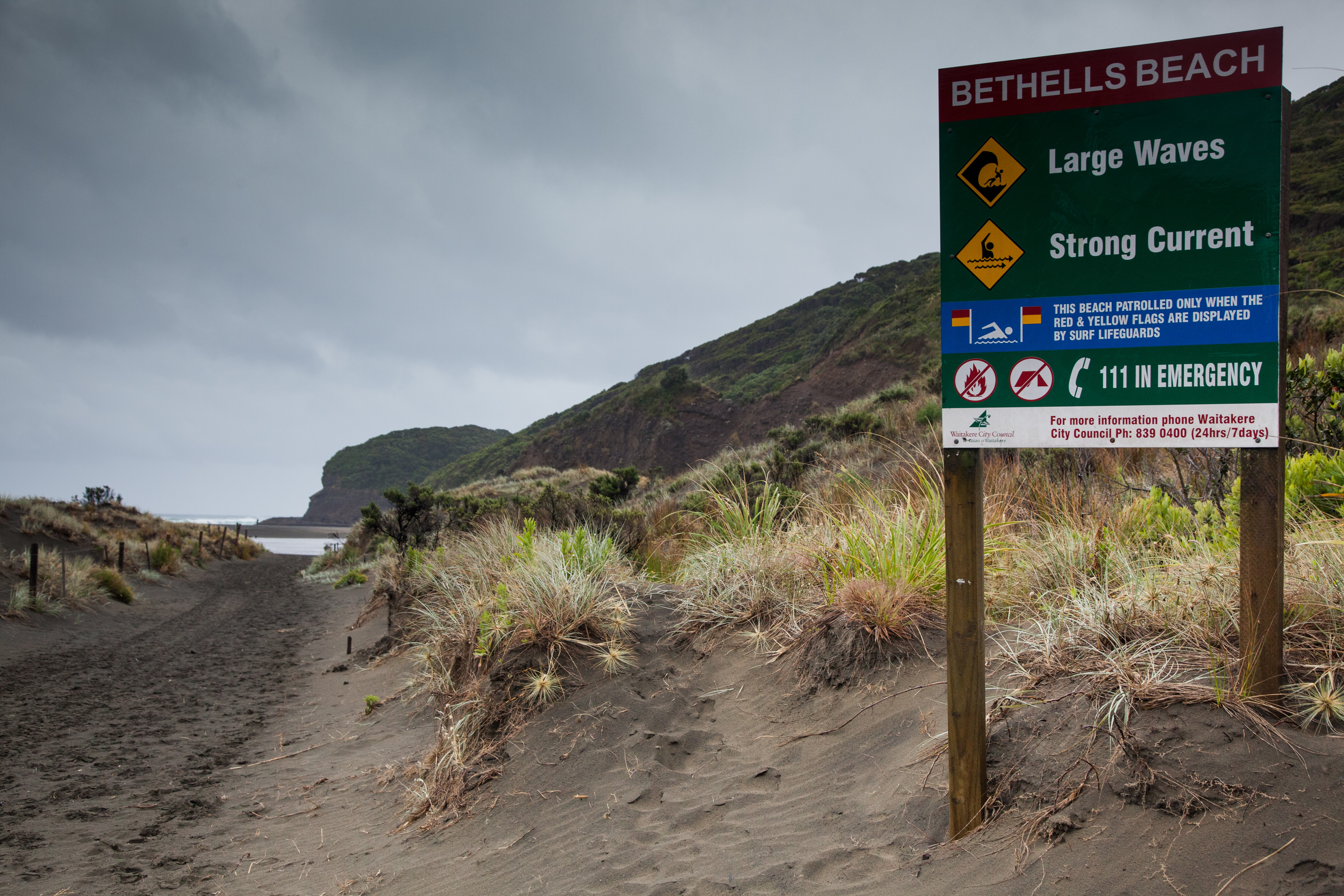
Te Henga / Bethells Beach is an ironsand beach located near Auckland, New Zealand

Ironsand occurs extensively on the west coast of New Zealand's North Island. The sand makes up a large portion of the black-sand beaches on the North Island, as well as the surrounding sea floor. The magnetite in the sand contains fairly large quantities of titanium, and is sometimes referred to as titanomagnetite. It was produced from volcanic eruptions that occurred in the Pleistocene epoch, and is formed due to the oceanic erosion of the volcanic rock which is washed ashore by the waves to form the dunes of the black beaches. The magnetite is mixed with sand made from andesite and rhyolite. The sand mixture typically contains 5 to 40% magnetite.

New Zealand had limited deposits of iron ore, but the deposits of ironsand were massive. It had been used by some early settlers to manufacture steel and pig iron, but the material could not be smelted in common bloomeries or blast furnaces. A few smelting companies formed in the late 19th and early 20th centuries, but were unable to process the ore with any economic success due to the sandy nature and high titanium content, which tended to form hard, brittle carbides in the steel. In 1939, a commission was formed to study the properties of the ore and devise a way of smelting it on an industrial scale. The commission determined that, by sintering the sand into bigger chunks or pellets, the problems of smelting the sand in a blast furnace could be eliminated. However, at that time World War II began, and thus further development was suspended and did not resume until the late 1960s, producing the first output of steel in 1969.

Ironsand is placer mined from Waikato North Head. 1.2 million tonnes is used by New Zealand Steel to create steel, in a unique manufacturing process. Mining at Taharoa produces up to 4 million tonnes for export. A previous mine existed at Waipipi in South Taranaki. A proposal by Iron Ore NZ Ltd. for further ironsand mining off the coast of Taranaki faced resistance from some Māori and others in 2005 in the wake of the New Zealand foreshore and seabed controversy. A large quantity of it is shipped to China and Japan, but by 2011 New Zealand's sole manufacturing plant was producing 650,000 metric tons of steel and iron per year. New Zealand is the only country to use ironsand for industrial smelting. The typical composition of the magnetite is 82% iron oxide, 8% titanium dioxide and 8% silica; 0.015% sulfur, and 0.015% phosphorus. In 100% concentrations of magnetite this had a maximum potential to yield ~ 58% metallic iron, although the titanium is unrecoverable by modern techniques.

=== United States ===
Ironsand is found extensively around the US, especially in the area of New York, Southern California, New England, and the Great Lakes, where it is often mixed with a feldspar sand and sometimes bright grains of garnet. The magnetite from these areas often contains high amounts of chromium and titanium. In the 19th century ironsand was sometimes used as blotter sand for concrete and masonry work, or more rarely as raw material for steel production; one blacksmith in Connecticut used it for making bar stock.

== History ==
According to the OED online entry for sand-iron, Jedidiah Morse (1761–1826), writing in The American universal geography (new edition, 1796 (2 vols)), stated that Jared Eliot (1685-1763) invented sand-iron, or the making of iron from black sand, in 1761. However, Japanese craftsmen have been using sand-iron in sword-making for at least 1200 years. The crafting of sand-iron in "tatara" smelters, made of brick and clay, is still practiced by Japanese craftsmen today.

== See also ==
- Iron filings
- Iron ore
- Ironstone
- Sand mining
