= Dialectics of Liberation Congress =

1967 international congress in London

The congress on the Dialectics of Liberation was an international congress organised in London between 15 and 30 July 1967. It was organised by R. D. Laing, David Cooper, the American educationalist Joe Berke, and Leon Redler. The scope of the conference was to "demystify human violence in all its forms, and the social systems from which it emanates, and to explore new forms of action". Significant speakers included Black Power leader Stokely Carmichael, beat poet Allen Ginsberg and humanist Marxist Herbert Marcuse. A short book of the conference was published in 1968 by Penguin Books, and some documentaries were made of the event, including Anatomy of Violence and Ah, Sunflower.

== History ==
In 1965, R. D. Laing and colleagues came together as a community for themselves and people in a state of psychosis. As a result, Kingsley Hall became home to the Philadelphia Association and one of the most radical experiments in psychiatry.

In January 1967, International Times announced: "This summer, in July, the Institute of Phenomenological Studies will make the move. A congress will convene in London on the Dialectics of Liberation. The congress intends to examine and expose the system of societal and inter-personal influences that converge on us from birth. This means clearing the field of all preconceptions regarding who, what and where we are, as well as all manner of socially convenient academic conventions that are propped up by politics, ideology and false philosophical justifications. For we are taught, and coerced, to see things through a filter of politically arrived at and socially sanctioned lies. The entire world as we 'know' it must be demystified."

The organizing group consisted of four psychiatrists who were very much concerned with radical innovation in their own field - to the extent of counter-labelling their discipline as anti-psychiatry. The four were Dr. R. D. Laing, Dr. David Cooper, Dr. Joseph Berke and Dr. Leon Redler.

== The conference ==
The event took place in summer 1967 at the Roundhouse in Camden. As summarised by historian Alexander Dunst,

the intellectual luminaries at the Congress included Gregory Bateson, Herbert Marcuse and Stokely Carmichael. Allen Ginsberg gave a lecture, read poetry, and led chants. Ginsberg quoted Burroughs at length, who preferred to sit in the audience during the day, and then get high with Laing in the evenings. CLR James spoke, as did a number of Black British and Caribbean writers: the poets Andrew Salkey and John LaRose, as well as the Cuban novelist Edmundo Desnoes, author of Memories of Underdevelopment. The activist and Buddhist monk Thích Nhất Hạnh reported from Vietnam and the Marxist philosopher Gajo Petrovic analyzed the political situation in Yugoslavia. Emmett Grogan, who co-founded a San Francisco community action group called The Diggers, gave a lecture as did Julian Beck, from the Living Theatre in New York.

The only invited woman speaker was American performance artist Carolee Schneemann, whose name was omitted from the poster and who was booed for being too radical.

Other participants included American left-wing academic John Gerassi, French Marxist Lucien Goldmann, libertarian socialist activist Paul Goodman, American sociologist Jules Henry, anthropologist Francis Huxley, artist Gustav Metzger, American poet Susan Sherman, family therapist Ross Speck (who stood in for Erving Goffman, who had withdrawn), and Marxist economist Paul Sweezy.

After the congress, Carmichael was asked to leave the country and was subsequently banned from re-entering.

== The book ==
A multi-volume book of speeches from the event was published and later translated into Danish, Swedish, Brazilian and Japanese editions. A single-volume book, Dialectics of Liberation was published by Penguin Books, later republished by Verso Books.

== Film and television ==
The BBC hosted a live discussion on between Carmichael, Laing and Paul Goodman on its Panorama programme, and hired director Roy Battersby and Iain Sinclair to produce a 90-minute documentary. The film was not screened and probably destroyed, "seemingly because the BBC disagreed with its support for the left-wing rhetoric espoused at the Congress". However, in the US, the PBS' predecessor broadcast a 30-minute documentary entitled Anatomy of Violence.

A short film, Ah, Sunflower, directed by Robert Klinkert and Iain Sinclair, and featuring Laing, Ginsberg, Carmichael and others, was filmed around the conference. The film was the subject of Sinclair's first (self-published) book, The Kodak Mantra Diaries. The film was re-released by Beat Scene Press of Coventry in 2007.

== Impact ==
The event had multiple impacts. Angela Davis attended and was inspired by Carmichael's speech to become engaged in the Black Power movement. Carmichael's three speeches at the congress (and his meetings with UK-based activists such as CLR James and Michael X) played a major role in building the British Black Power movement.

The absence of women's voices was mentioned by UK feminists Juliet Mitchell and Sheila Rowbotham as a motivation for starting the Women’s Liberation Movement shortly afterwards.

The congress also inspired the Antiuniversity of London, a radical education project based in Shoreditch.

== 2012 reenactment ==
An event was staged in February 2012 at Kingsley Hall, which used actors to speak the words of the original contributors to the 1967 event.
