= Stephen Ticktin =

Canadian psychiatrist (born 1946)

Stephen Ticktin

Stephen Jan Ticktin (born 1941) is a Canadian psychiatrist, therapist, lecturer, and prominent figure in the anti-psychiatry movement. After earning his medical degree from the University of Toronto in 1973, Ticktin became personal assistant to anti-psychiatry movement leader David Cooper, travelling with him through Europe, North America, South America and Mexico on his lecture tours (1972–1976). He also studied with the Philadelphia Association and apprenticed in existential therapy with R. D. Laing. In 1983, Ticktin obtained an MRCPsych in Psychiatry through the Royal College of Psychiatrists in London, and in the course of the decades during which Ticktin made the UK his home, he helped to found the British Network of Alternatives to Psychiatry and the Supportive Psychotherapy Association.

Ticktin joined the editorial collective of Asylum in 1987 and has published articles in a number of British psychiatry journals. Ticktin has also been a visiting lecturer and supervisor at the Regent's College School of Psychotherapy and Counselling, and at The New School of Psychotherapy and Counselling at Schiller International University, where he worked with Emmy van Deurzen. In 2004, he returned to Canada where he saw patients in private practice and was also adjunct faculty at the Living Institute in Toronto.

== Publications ==
- "The User's Voice in Mental Health Services" in Asylum: Magazine for Democratic Psychiatry, Vol. 5 (3) 1991
- "Friendship, Therapy, Camaraderie: An Existential Approach to Therapy With Young People" in Case Studies in Existential Psychotherapy, Simon Du Plock, Ed. (Wiley, Chichester, 1997)
- "R. D. Laing, A Tribute" in R.D. Laing, Creative Destroyer, Bob Mullan, Ed. (Cassell, London, 1997)
- "R.D. Laing's Divided Tooth" in Journal of the Society for Existential Analysis, Vol. 5
- "'Ticktin's Syndrome', or, The Post-Psychiatric Post Confusional State" in Asylum: Magazine for Democratic Psychiatry, Vol.3 (2)
- "Brother Beast: A Personal Mémoir of David Cooper" in Asylum: Magazine for Democratic Psychiatry, Vol. 1 (3).
- Review of "R.D. Laing, A Biography, by Adrian Laing" (London: Peter Owen, 1994) in Journal of the Society for Existential Analysis
- "R.D. Laing, A Tribute" in Asylum: Magazine for Democratic Psychiatry, Vol. 4 (2) 1990

== Sources ==
- Biography on the Society For Laingian Studies website.
- Stephen Ticktin Living Institute biography
