= The Self and Others =

Psychological study by R. D. Laing first published in 1961

- Author: R. D. Laing
- Language: English
- Publisher: Tavistock Institute
- Publication date: 1961
- Publication place: United Kingdom
- Media type: Print (Hardback)
- Pages: 156

The Self and Others is a psychological study by R. D. Laing, first published in 1961 by the Tavistock Institute. It was re-issued in a second edition (1969), which (in Laing's words) was “extensively revised, without being changed in any fundamental way”.

The book was presented as "a study of persona relations in situations of extremity". The book formed part of a series of writings by Laing in the 1960s on the relationship of madness to the self within a social context or nexus, writings which created something of a cult of Laing at the time.

== Structure ==
Self and Others is divided into two parts, called respectively 'Modes of Interpersonal Experience' and 'Forms of Interpersonal Action'. In the first part, Laing sets out from a critique of the Kleinian view of unconscious phantasy, as set out by Susan Sutherland Isaacs, for its lack of recognition of the interpersonal dialectics inherent in human experience. He also uses Kleinian thought to emphasize the omnipresence of social phantasy systems.

In the second part, Laing explored the extent to which an individual is or is not invested in their own actions, using ideas drawn from Martin Buber and Jean-Paul Sartre. He also extended the American concept of the double bind to cover the experience of the schizoid patient.

In both sections, Laing uses material from Dostoyevsky to illustrate his theoretical points.

== See also ==
- Antipsychiatry
- David Cooper
- Existential psychotherapy
