= Mary Barnes (artist) =

English artist and writer (1923–2001)

- Born: Mary Edith Barnes; 9 February 1923; Portsmouth, England, United Kingdom
- Died: 29 June 2001 (aged 78); Tomintoul, Scotland, United Kingdom
- Known for: Painting

Mary Edith Barnes (9 February 1923 – 29 June 2001) was an English artist and writer with schizophrenia and became a successful painter. She is particularly known for documenting her experience at R. D. Laing's experimental therapeutic community at Kingsley Hall, London. She is referenced in the book The Psychopath Test by Jon Ronson and Thomas Szasz's Schizophrenia.

== Life ==
=== Early life ===
Mary Barnes grew up in Portsmouth, England and then later in the London countryside. Her father was a lab technician and her mother was a homemaker. When Barnes was 18, her brother Peter, who was 16 at the time, was committed to a psychiatric ward and diagnosed with schizophrenia. A few years later he was sent to long-term institutional care.

=== Nursing career ===
Barnes trained as a nurse and joined the army in World War II. In 1945, Barnes spent a year working at hospitals in Egypt and Palestine. She worked in Frankfurt for two years before returning to London as a full-time nurse.

=== Kingsley Hall ===
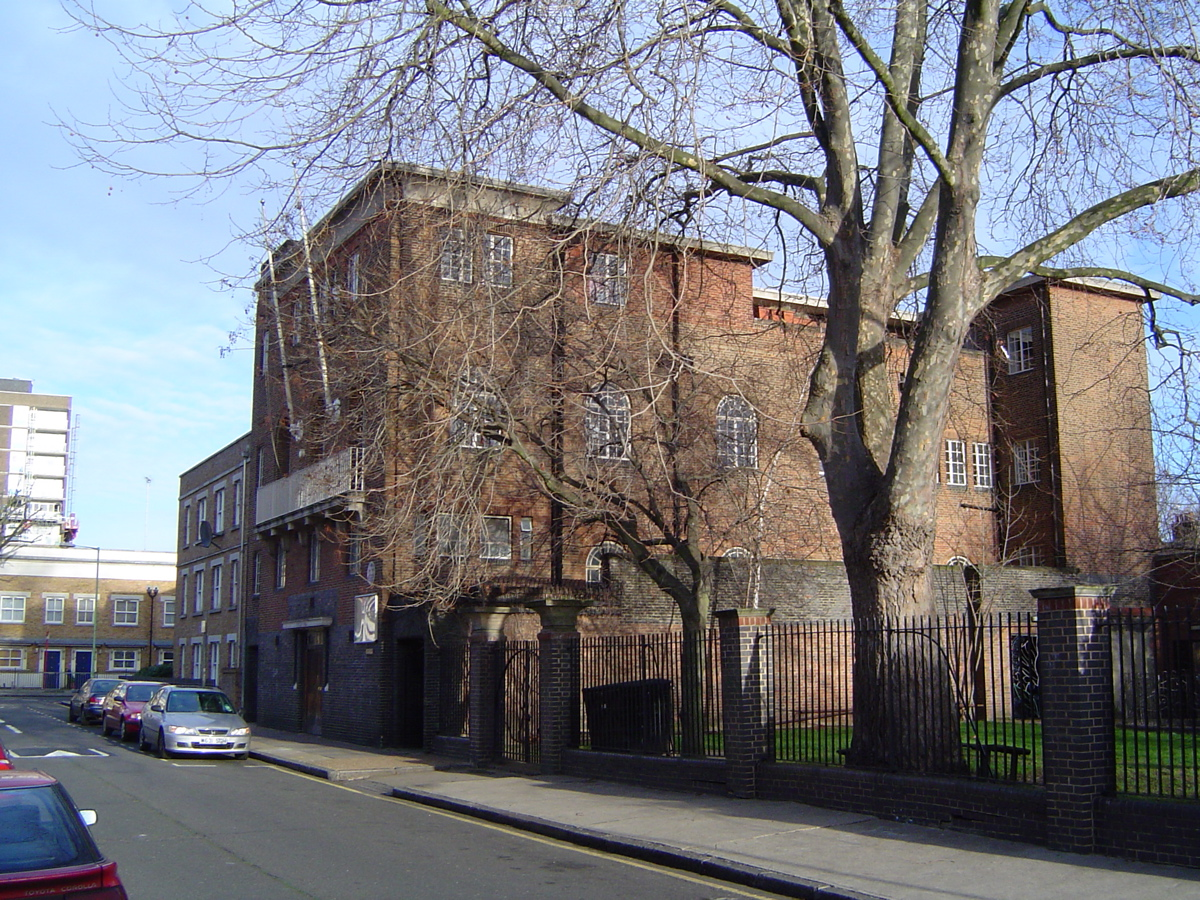
Kingsley Hall

Barnes had her first psychotic breakdown in 1952. She was admitted to St. Bernard's Hospital and diagnosed with schizophrenia. After a year, Barnes was discharged and returned to working as a nursing tutor.

In 1963, after reading R. D. Laing's book The Divided Self, she contacted him and began therapy. She was admitted to Kingsley Hall as the first patient. This intensified in 1965 when she underwent regression therapy. During the process, she discovered a talent for art. She would later be described as "an ambassador for Laing", emerging from her journey to co-author a book about it with Dr. Joseph Berke, the resident psychiatrist who helped her.

== Artistic career ==
Barnes's first paintings were done with her own feces on the walls, depicting black breasts. Berke later gave her grease crayons which led to Barnes evolving from crayon scribbles, to finger-painting, and ultimately to oil painting. Her works, vivid oils often depicting religious themes, were first shown at the Camden Arts Centre in 1969. She subsequently became a respected artist, painting evocative works based on her experiences and showing her work on tour worldwide, accompanied with talks about her experiences and mental health. In 1979 a play was produced, with script by Barnes with David Edgar. This was broadcast on BBC radio in the United Kingdom, most recently in December 2011 on Radio 4 Extra.

In 1985, she moved to Scotland. Something Sacred, her book of conversations, writings and paintings, was published in 1989. In 1993, she moved to Tomintoul, where she died in 2001, aged 78.

In 2010 there was a major retrospective exhibition of Barnes's work at Space studios in London and in 2015 at Bow Arts. Boo-bah, a retrospective co-curated by Dr. Joe Berke featured Barnes's work on paper and board in pastels and oils alongside photographs chronicling the therapeutic period at nearby Kingsley Hall. The exhibition Boo-Bah refers to a pet name Barnes called Berke in a love letter she wrote which was over a meter high.

In 2023–24, Rebirth: The life and legacy of Mary Barnes featured a series of events to mark what would have been Barnes's 100th birthday. This featured as part of the Scottish Mental Health Arts Festival and included an exhibition at the Advanced Research Centre in Glasgow and events at Falkland Palace, including the Chapel Royal, where Barnes's funeral was held in 2001. The Rebirth exhibition featured work created during her later life in Scotland, alongside a contemporary installation by Luke Fowler, What you see is where you are at, 2001. Speakers at panel events included Professor Victoria Tischler, curator of Rebirth exhibition, University of Surrey, and Ninian Stuart, hereditary keeper of Falkland Palace and friend of Barnes.

In 2023 Wellcome Collection acquired Barnes's archive and a significant body of her artwork, created whilst at Kingsley Hall. A collaborative PhD studentship (University of Surrey/Wellcome Collection) commenced in January 2025. The project will investigate Barnes's life, work, and legacy through exploration of her artwork and archive.

== Publications ==
- Mary Barnes (play) with David Edgar (1979), published by Methuen Publishing Ltd ISBN 0-413-40070-0
- Something Sacred: Conversations, Writings, Paintings (1989) with Ann Scott, published by Free Association Books, (hardcover ISBN 1-85343-101-X, paperback ISBN 1-85343-100-1).
- Two Accounts of a Journey Through Madness (1991) with Joseph Berke, published by Free Association Books, (paperback) ISBN 1-85343-125-7. Hardback published (2002) by The Other Press, ISBN 1-59051-016-X.
