= Esterson =

Esterson is a surname. Notable people with the surname include:

- Aaron Esterson (1923–1999), British psychiatrist
- Bill Esterson (born 1966), British politician
- Max Esterson (born 2002), American racing driver
