= Calvin C. Hernton =

American poet and author (1932–2001)

- Born: Calvin Coolidge Hernton; April 28, 1932; Chattanooga, Tennessee, U.S.
- Died: September 30, 2001 (aged 69); Oberlin, Ohio, U.S.
- Education: Talladega College; Fisk University
- Occupations: Sociologist, writer
- Notable work: Sex and Racism in America (1965); The Sexual Mountain and Black Women Writers (1987)

Calvin Coolidge Hernton (April 28, 1932 – September 30, 2001) was an American sociologist, poet and author, particularly renowned for his 1965 study Sex and Racism in America, which has been described as "a frank look at the role sexual tensions played in the American racial divide, and it helped set the tone for much African-American social criticism over the following decade."

== Biography ==
Hernton was born in Chattanooga, Tennessee, United States, on April 28, 1932. He studied at Talladega College in Alabama, where he received a B.A. in sociology (1954), and at Fisk University, where he earned a master's degree. In the mid-1950s, he worked as a social worker in New York City. He also gave poetry readings there and co-founded the magazine Umbra, which published a collective of Black writers including Langston Hughes, Ishmael Reed and Alice Walker. Hernton subsequently went to London, England, and worked with the Institute of Phenomenological Studies (1965–69), studying under R. D. Laing. Hernton was active alongside Obi Egbuna, C. L. R. James and others in the Antiuniversity of London.

Hernton returned to the US in 1970, and went to Oberlin College as a writer-in-residence, two years later joining the Black Studies department. He was a professor of African-American Studies there until his retirement in 1999.

Hernton was the author of nine books that reflect his writings as a poet, novelist, essayist, playwright, and social scientist, including the bestselling Sex and Racism In America (1965), which was translated into several languages, and the ground-breaking The Sexual Mountain and Black Women Writers: Adventures in Sex, Literature, and Real Life (1987). His poems were also published in Essence, Evergreen Review and Black Scholar, among other places, and on various recordings and were performed in plays on Broadway and on tour.

In 2011, the Chelsea Art Museum recreated a performance of Black Zero, a happening staged by Aldo Tambellini at Group Center on several occasions between 1963 and 1965. Sound recordings of Hernton reciting his poetry were accompanied by improvised performances by Ben Morea and Henry Grimes.

Hernton died in Oberlin, Ohio, at the age of 69.

== Bibliography ==
Fiction

- Scarecrow (novel; 1974)

Non-Fiction

- Sex and Racism in America (Doubleday, 1965)
- White Papers for White Americans (Doubleday, 1966)
- Coming Together: Black Power, White Hatred, and Sexual Hang-ups (Doubleday, 1971)
- (with Joseph Berke) The Cannabis Experience: An Interpretative Study of the Effects of Marijuana and Hashish (London: Peter Owen, 1974)
- The Sexual Mountain and Black Women Writers: Adventures in Sex, Literature, and Real Life (1987)

Poetry

- The Coming of Chronos to the House of Nightsong: An Epical Narrative of the South (Interim Books, 1964)
- Medicine Man: Collected Poems (Reed Cannon & Johnson Publishing, 1976)
- The Red Crab Gang and Black River Poems (Ishmael Reed Publishing Company, 1999)
- Selected Poems, edited by David Grundy and Lauri Scheyer (Wesleyan University Press, 2023)

Plays

- Glad to Be Dead (1958)
- Flame (1958)
- The Place (1972)
- (These plays remain unpublished)

Contributions to anthologies

- (Poetry) Rosey E. Pool, ed., Beyond the Blues: New Poems by American Negroes (Hand & Flower Press, 1962)
- (Poetry and essay) LeRoi Jones and Larry Neal, eds, Black Fire: An Anthology of Afro-American Writing (Morrow, 1969)
