= Ontological security =

Concept in sociology

The term ontological security was coined by psychiatrist R. D. Laing in the book The Divided Self in which it is described as a "basic existential position" from which a person "will encounter all the hazards of life, social, ethical, spiritual, biological, from a centrally firm sense of his [sic] own and other people's reality and identity." Ontological, in this context, is not used in a philosophical sense but in an empirical one, since Laing considered it the "best adverbial or adjectival derivative of being." The intellectual traditions that inform the concept are psychoanalysis, specifically British object relations theory in which Laing was trained, and existential philosophy.

In sociology, ontological security is a stable mental state derived from a sense of continuity in regard to the events in one's life. Anthony Giddens (1991) refers to ontological security as a sense of order and continuity in regard to an individual's experiences. He argues that this is reliant on people's ability to give meaning to their lives. Meaning is found in experiencing positive and stable emotions, and by avoiding chaos and anxiety. If an event occurs that is not consistent with the meaning of an individual's life, this will threaten that individual's ontological security. Ontological security also involves having a positive view of self, the world, and the future.

== History ==
The term ontological security was first introduced into the field of psychology in 1960 by R. D. Laing in his book The Divided Self. He used the term to distinguish mentally healthy individuals from those with schizophrenia and other schizophrenia spectrum disorders. According to Laing, a person with schizophrenia does not feel wholly embodied, but instead experiences a constant threat of implosion, coming from the outside world, which can eventually develop into hallucinations, delusions, and paranoia. This psychological sense of the term relates to basic symptoms of schizophrenia and self-disorders.

The term was subsequently adopted by sociologists, but in a decontextualized sense – for example, sociologists would not claim that people who are not ontologically secure (in the sociological sense) have schizophrenia, or that home ownership, which is associated with ontological security, would prevent someone from developing schizophrenia.

== Threat of death ==
Philip A. Mellor and Chris Shelling talk about this concept in regard to thanatology, arguing that when death strikes, it causes people to "question the meaningfulness and reality of the social frameworks in which they participate, shattering their ontological security".

== Applications ==
=== Home ownership ===
"It has been said that people need the confidence, continuity and trust in the world which comprise ontological security in order to lead happy and fulfilled lives, and furthermore that ontological security can be attained more through owner occupied than rented housing".

Children are more likely to have a positive ontological security when the child's parents own their own home. Reportedly, home ownership also improves parenting and allows for a future transfer of assets, thus facilitating ontological security.

What is also true is that in societies such as Germany and other Northern European countries, where renting is stable and well regulated, stability does not necessarily equate with home ownership.

In the UK, working poor and many middle income families are under severe financial stress due to the increasing cost of home ownership and of renting, which pays the mortgages of landlords. Both of these are encouraged by the Government's ideology of 'growing the economy' which in turn creates chronic stress that often lead to health-related issues which impact adults' and children's lives adversely.

The issue of ontological security, then, has to do with security of tenure in regard to stability of home life for the child and his or her parents, rather than home ownership per se.

One has to be cautious in this regard to avoid co-opting the concept of ontological security for any specific economic agenda, and always be focused on the lived experience and how it plays out under the influence of Government policies and events in the material concrete reality.

Furthermore, reducing the matter of a child's ontological security to the material aspect of housing ignores issues such as 'traditional' parenting practices, religiosity, unresolved parental trauma disrupting empathy-based relationships and other chronic stressors that are almost ubiquitous.

=== Adult learners ===
"Adult educators also must secure the learners' ontological security against existential anxieties by associating learners' network and groups based on trust".

=== International relations ===
The concept of ontological security has been applied in international relations. According to C. Nicolai L. Gellwitzki, international relations research has developed along three distinct lines: a sociological approach inspired by Anthony Giddens, an existential approach drawing on philosophers such as Paul Tillich, Martin Heidegger, and Søren Kierkegaard, and a psychoanalytic approach, primarily based on the work of either Melanie Klein or Jacques Lacan.

The Giddensian approach has argued that states seek to ensure their ontological security (the security of self and self-conception), in addition to their pursuit of physical security (such as protecting the territorial integrity of the state). To ensure their ontological security, states may even jeopardize their physical security. Ontological security in the Giddensian tradition can be defined as the possession, on the level of the unconscious and practical consciousness, of answers to fundamental questions that all polities in some way need to address such as existence, finitude, relations with others and their autobiography. Collective actors such as states become ontologically insecure when critical situations often referred to as dislocatory events rupture their routines thus bringing fundamental questions to public discourse and propagating existential anxiety. In this context, the self of these collective actors is often contrasted to the other for purposes of stabilising and maintaining as well as to contest and renegotiate a positive identity and self-conception. This distinction has been used in order to examine identity dynamics in countries such as the United Kingdom, Germany, Turkey, Finland, Sweden, Thailand, and Japan and China.

In contrast, the existential approach primarily focuses on the constitutive role of anxiety in global politics, whereas psychoanalytic approaches explore the psychological mechanisms underpinning anxiety management. The existential perspective treats anxiety as an inherent condition of being and statehood arising from the fundamental groundlessness of life and the international system. Meanwhile, psychoanalytic frameworks examine how collective actors employ psychological defenses, such as projection or splitting, to maintain a coherent sense of self and manage the internal and external tensions that threaten their identity.

== See also ==
- Anthony Giddens
- Depersonalization
- Maslow's hierarchy of needs
- Personal identity
- Strategic culture
