= Asylum =

Asylum may refer to:

== Types of asylum ==
- Asylum (antiquity), places of refuge in ancient Greece and Rome
- Benevolent asylum, a 19th-century Australian institution for housing the destitute
- Cities of Refuge, places of refuge in ancient Judea
- Sanctuary, a right to be safe from arrest in the sanctuary of a church or temple
- Lunatic asylum or mental asylum, a historical term for psychiatric hospital
- Asylum, a common word for modern psychiatric hospitals
- Orphan asylum, orphanage
- Right of asylum, refuge from persecution in another country

== Entertainment ==
=== Fiction ===
- Asylum (comics), a comic book series by Maximum Press
- Asylum (Darvill-Evans novel), a 2001 Doctor Who novel
- Asylum (McGrath novel), a 1996 novel by Patrick McGrath
- Asylum (Seabrook book), a 1935 memoir by William Seabrook
- Asylum (novel series), a young adult horror series
- Asylums (book), a 1961 nonfiction book by Erving Goffman

=== Film ===
- Asylum (1972 horror film), a horror film starring Peter Cushing
- Asylum (1972 documentary film), a film featuring the psychiatrist R. D. Laing
- Asylum (2003 film), an American short documentary
- Asylum (2005 film), a British drama by David Mackenzie based on the novel by Patrick McGrath
- Asylum (2008 film), an American horror film by David R. Ellis
- Asylum (2014 film), an American horror film

=== Television ===
- Asylum (1996 TV series), a UK comedy series on Paramount Comedy Channel
- Asylum (2015 TV series), a UK comedy series on the BBC
- "Asylum" (Law & Order), an episode of Law & Order
- "Asylum" (Moon Knight), an episode of Moon Knight
- "Asylum" (Person of Interest), an episode of Person of Interest
- "Asylum" (Sliders), an episode of Sliders
- "Asylum" (Supernatural), an episode of Supernatural
- "Asylum" (Torchwood), a 2009 episode of Torchwood
- American Horror Story: Asylum, the second season of American Horror Story

=== Albums ===
- Asylum (Atrophy album), 2024
- Asylum (The Back Horn album), 2010
- Asylum (Disturbed album), 2010
- Asylum (Kiss album), 1985
- Asylum (The Legendary Pink Dots album), 1985

=== Songs ===
- "Asylum" (The Orb song), 1997
- "Asylum", by Andromeda from Manifest Tyranny
- "Asylum", by Disturbed from Asylum
- "Asylum", by John Legend from Love in the Future
- "Asylum", by Alanis Morissette from Flavors of Entanglement (non-album track)
- "Asylum", by Gary Numan from The Pleasure Principle
- "Asylum", by Onslaught from In Search of Sanity
- "Asylum", by Slaughterhouse, featuring Eminem, from Welcome to: Our House
- "Asylum", by Supertramp from Crime of the Century
- "Asylum", by Watchtower from Energetic Disassembly
- "Asylum", by Billy Woods from Aethiopes

== Other ==
- Asylum Entertainment, an American television production company
- Asylum Township, Pennsylvania, U.S.
- Asylum (magazine), a magazine about mental health and psychiatry
- Asylum Records, an American record label
- Asylum (1981 video game), an adventure game
- Asylum (2025 video game), a horror game
- TNA Asylum, a former hosting venue for Total Nonstop Action Wrestling
- The Asylum, an American film production company known for their mockbusters
- Weekend at the Asylum, a large annual steampunk event held in Lincoln, England

== See also ==
- immigration lawyer
- Asylum seeker (disambiguation)
- Elysium (disambiguation)
