= John Heaton =

John Heaton may refer to:

- John Heaton (metallurgist) (1818–1897), British metallurgist
- John Henniker Heaton (1848–1914), British politician & activist
- John Heaton (New Mexico politician), member of the New Mexico House of Representatives
- John Heaton (athlete) (1908–1976), American bobsledder and skeleton racer
- John Heaton (psychotherapist), cofounder of the Philadelphia Association in 1965
- John Heaton (The Bill), a character on The Bill

== See also ==
- John Heaton-Armstrong (1888–1967), British government administrator
