= David Smail =

David Smail is the name of:

- David Smail (golfer) (born 1970), New Zealand golfer
- David Smail (psychologist) (1938–2014), author and former head of clinical psychology services in Nottingham, UK
