= Queen Louise's Asylum Society =

The Queen Louise's Asylum Society was founded in 1887 with the aim of running nurseries (asylums) in Copenhagen. It has two nurseries: one at 39 Stefansgade (now 45 Bjelkes Allé) (opened on 7 October 1888, a single-storey building in the pavilion style, designed by Vilhelm Dahlerup) and one at 10 Guldbergsgade (purchased in 1888, a two-storey building). Together, they had an estimated capacity for 290 children.

As early as 1864, a nursery named after the Queen had been established in Silkeborg. In 1898, the organisation commissioned the construction of a sanatorium for young children in Ordrup (1898, designed by Bernhard and Valdemar Ingemann). Later, further institutions were also established in North Zealand.
