= Austin Kocher =

American political and legal geographer

- Education: Ohio State University (PhD)
- Scientific career
- Fields: Geography, Immigration Policy
- Workplaces: Syracuse University; American University
- Website: austinkocher.com

Austin Kocher is an American political and legal geographer whose research focuses on immigration enforcement, asylum processes, and the role of data in U.S. border control. He is a research assistant professor at Syracuse University's S.I. Newhouse School of Public Communications..

== Education ==
Kocher earned his B.A. (2008), M.A. (2011), and Ph.D. (2017) in geography from Ohio State University. His doctoral dissertation, Notice to Appear: Immigration Courts and the Legal Production of Illegalized Immigrants, examined how legal and administrative processes shape migration outcomes in the United States

== Career ==
Prior to his current appointment at the Newhouse School, Kocher served as a research assistant professor at the Transactional Records Access Clearinghouse (TRAC), a research center at Syracuse University that analyzes federal government data obtained through the Freedom of Information Act (FOIA). At TRAC, his work focused on managing large-scale datasets related to immigration court backlogs and asylum adjudication trends.

He is an affiliated expert for the Institute for Democracy, Journalism and Citizenship and serves as a research fellow at the Center for Latin American and Latino Studies (CLALS) at American University.

== Research and Media Coverage ==
Kocher's research focuses on the operation of the U.S. immigration court system and the use of digital technologies in immigration enforcement. His work has examined the “digitization” of border control, including the use of smartphone applications and electronic monitoring systems in the management of asylum seekers.

His analysis of immigration data has been cited in national media coverage regarding asylum trends, immigration court backlogs, and federal enforcement practices. His findings have been featured in reporting by The Guardian, CNN, The Economist, and NPR.

Kocher has provided expert commentary for broadcast and investigative programs, including NBC Nightly News, C-SPAN's Washington Journal, and a 2025 segment of Last Week Tonight with John Oliver focused on immigration enforcement trends. His data methodology for tracking ICE detention populations was utilized by the Financial Times, and he was interviewed on On with Kara Swisher regarding data transparency and oversight in the immigration system.

== Selected publications ==
- Jones, R., Kocher, A., et al. (2024). "Interventions on public geographies." Political Geography.
- Davidson, L., Hlass, L., & Kocher, A. (2023). "The Double Abandonment of Immigrant Youth." Georgetown Law Journal.
- Kocher, A. (2023). "Glitches in the Digitization of Asylum: How CBP One Turns Migrants’ Smartphones into Mobile Borders." Societies.
- Kocher, A., & Stuesse, A. (2020). "Undocumented Activism and Minor Politics: Inside the Cramped Political Spaces of Deportation Defense Campaigns." Antipode.
- Kocher, A. (2021). "Migrant Protection Protocols and the Death of Asylum." Journal of Latin American Geography.
