= Mildred Fahrni =

Canadian activist

- Born: Mildred Osterhout; 2 January 1900; Manitoba, Canada
- Died: 13 April 1992 (aged 92); Vancouver, British Columbia, Canada
- Education: University of British Columbia; Bryn Mawr College
- Occupations: social activist, feminist, pacifist
- Years active: 1924-1979

Mildred Fahrni (1900-1992) was a Canadian pacifist and socialist, who became friends with Gandhi and Martin Luther King Jr. She was a leader of the Women's International League for Peace and Freedom (WILPF) and the Fellowship of Reconciliation. Fahrni actively opposed World War II and the xenophobia that led to Japanese Canadian internment and the internment of Dukhobor children. She was an ardent feminist and social activist.

== Biography ==
Mildred Osterhout was born in rural Manitoba on 2 January 1900 to Reverend Abram and Hattie Osterhout. Her family relocated to British Columbia in 1914. Between 1919 and 1923 she attended the University of British Columbia (UBC), earning a Bachelor of Arts in English and Philosophy. She went on to complete a Master's in Philosophy in 1923, also at UBC. After her schooling, Osterhout began working as a secretary for both the Vancouver branch of the YMCA and the Canadian Memorial Church (CMC), but winning a scholarship to Bryn Mawr College, in 1930 she returned to school. At school in Pennsylvania, she met Muriel Lester and was invited to work for six months at Kingsley Hall in London. Serendipitously, Osterhout's arrival in London corresponded with the Round Table Conferences on India's independence. Mahatma Gandhi, who was attending the conferences, was also in residence at Kingsley Hall, and her meeting with him, changed the direction of Osterhout's life.

She returned to Canada in 1933 and began working as a social worker. That same year, she attended the Co-operative Commonwealth Federation Conference in Regina, which formally founded the party and launched the Regina Manifesto. She ran for federal office in both the 1933 and 1938 elections on the CCF ticket, losing both times, deciding after the second loss to visit Gandhi in India. After her visit, she returned to Canada, took up a teaching position at Carleton Elementary School in 1939 and cared for her ailing father, who died in 1940. In 1941, Osterhout married Walter Fahrni and began a tour across Canada lecturing on peace an opposition to Canadian involvement in World War II. Failing to dissuade involvement and opposed to the government's xenophobia, Fahrni volunteered to teach without pay in the school at New Denver with Japanese Canadian internment detainees.

Throughout the 1940s and 1950s, Mildred traveled internationally for pacifist causes. She attended the 1945 founding conference of the United Nations and attended the 1947 Primer Congreso Interamericano de Mujeres held in Guatemala City as a representative of the Women's International League for Peace and Freedom (WILPF). Earlier in 1947, she had been elected president of the Vancouver branch of the WILPF but she resigned in 1948 when she moved to Toronto to accept a position as the National Secretary of the Fellowship of Reconciliation (FOR). After five years, she transferred to Vancouver, acting as the Western Secretary for FOR. The following year, 1949, Fahrni traveled to India, to participate in the World Pacifist Meeting. She was an active public speaker discussing topics of non-violence, poverty, and social change as well as publishing articles on those subjects. In the 1950s, she wrote many submissions for the Doukhobor Inquirer and was sympathetic to their persecution. Between 1953 and 1959, the Canadian government interned Doukhobor children in the residential schools in New Denver and Fahrni once again offered her teaching services.

In 1955, Fahrni traveled as a representative of the Fellowship of Reconciliation to Montgomery, Alabama to participate in the Montgomery bus boycott. An admirer of Martin Luther King Jr. because of his involvement with Gandhi, they became friends and carried on correspondence about social issues and pacifism for many years. Her husband died in 1958 and Fahrni rented out rooms to boarders and students, living in a commune-type setting. Between 1963 and 1979, she wintered at the Quakers' community center Casa de los Amigos in Mexico City, carrying out community services. From 1970 on, Fahrni served as a host for Servas, an international peace organization, which uses travel and host-family stays to promote peace. She traveled with Servas through South America. In 1991, she was awarded the Vancouver Peace Award.

Fahrni died on 13 April 1992 in Vancouver, British Columbia, Canada.

== See also ==
- List of peace activists
