= Strategic culture =

Strategic culture is a concept in international relations and security studies referring to a nation's or political community's shared set of beliefs, assumptions and patterns of behavior regarding the use of force and the pursuit of security objectives. The term was introduced by Jack L. Snyder in a 1977 RAND Corporation report analyzing Soviet nuclear doctrine.

The concept was developed to account for observed differences in security behavior among states that could not be explained by material factors alone, such as military capability or geographic position. It has been applied to the study of nuclear strategy, defence policy, alliance behavior and the use of military force.

== Origins ==
In the 1970s, Western analysts of nuclear strategy generally assumed that Soviet decision-makers understood nuclear deterrence in the same terms as their American counterparts, within the framework of mutual assured destruction (MAD). Snyder challenged this assumption, arguing that the Soviet military establishment operated within a distinct strategic culture shaped by Russian historical experience and the organizational interests of the Soviet armed forces. He defined strategic culture as "the sum total of ideas, conditioned emotional responses, and patterns of habitual behavior that members of a national strategic community have acquired through instruction or imitation and share with each other with regard to nuclear strategy."

Ken Booth's Strategy and Ethnocentrism (1979) independently argued that Western strategic analysis was ethnocentric, assuming the universality of its own categories and overlooking the fact that different cultures understand threats and acceptable responses differently.

== Scholarly debate ==
Subsequent scholarship is commonly divided into three generations, distinguished by their treatment of the relationship between culture and behavior.

=== First generation ===
The first generation, active from the late 1970s through the 1980s, treated strategic culture as a broad context shaping state behavior. Colin S. Gray argued that every state possesses a distinctive strategic culture rooted in its geography, history and political structure, and that this culture constitutes the semi-permanent context in which strategic decisions are made. Analyzing the "American style in strategy," Gray identified features such as technological optimism, impatience and a tendency to moralize conflict.

Critics, notably Johnston, faulted this generation for broad definitions that risked unfalsifiability: if strategic culture encompasses both behavior and its causes, it cannot be disproved by observing behavior.

=== Second generation ===
The second generation, influenced by post-structuralism, treated strategic culture not as an objective context but as a tool of legitimation. Bradley Klein argued that declared strategic culture serves elites to justify security policy and to exclude alternatives from public debate. This generation introduced the distinction between declared and actual strategic culture but was criticized for difficulty in moving from discourse critique to explanatory theory.

=== Third generation ===
Alastair Iain Johnston proposed a narrower definition designed to be empirically testable: "an integrated system of symbols... which acts to establish pervasive and long-lasting strategic preferences by formulating concepts of the role and efficacy of military force in interstate political affairs." In a study of Ming dynasty China, Johnston identified two coexisting strategic traditions and demonstrated that actual decisions consistently aligned with an offensive parabellum paradigm rather than the publicly espoused Confucian idealism.

Subsequent comparative work includes Kerry Longhurst's study of German post-unification security policy and Christoph Meyer's analysis of convergence among EU member states' strategic cultures.

== Strategic culture change ==
A central question in the literature is whether and how strategic culture changes. Longhurst proposed a three-level model distinguishing foundational elements (deep beliefs about the role of force, changing slowest), regulatory practices (doctrines and institutional structures) and security practices (day-to-day operational decisions, changing fastest). She argued that a strategic shock may force rapid change at the level of security practices while foundational elements change only when the new experience is deep enough to undermine core beliefs.

The Finnish accession to NATO in 2023, after over seven decades of neutrality, has been cited as an example of strategic shock altering foundational elements: public support for NATO membership rose from approximately 25% to over 75% within months of the Russian invasion of Ukraine.

== Criticism ==
The concept has attracted three main lines of criticism. First, it risks essentialism: attributing fixed strategic characteristics to nations while overlooking internal plurality. Second, if defined broadly, strategic culture can be used to explain any observed behavior retrospectively, making it unfalsifiable. Third, realists argue that when states face clear threats, material interests override cultural predispositions, limiting the explanatory power of the concept to situations of ambiguity.

== See also ==
- Security studies
- Nuclear strategy
- Deterrence theory
- Securitization (international relations)
- Ontological security
