= Doris Lester =

English Christian pacifist (1886-1965)

- Born: Verona Doris Lester; 28 July 1886; Leytonstone, England
- Died: 14 February 1965 (aged 78)
- Relatives: Muriel Lester (sister)

Verona Doris Lester (28 July 1886 – 14 February 1965) was born in Leytonstone, Essex, England. She was the sister of Muriel Lester. Doris Lester was responsible for founding Children's House and Kingsley Hall in Bow East London with her sister Muriel Doris Lester worked with Muriel, but was not the international figure that her elder sister Muriel was. She received a telegram from Muriel in 1941 about her imprisonment in Trinidad. She played an active part in the management of Kingsley Hall, including the postwar period.

Doris Lester's papers are part of an archive currently held at the Bishopsgate Institute in London.

== Publications ==
- The Challenge of the Adolescent Girl (Intermediate Department Papers. no. 3.) 1921 by Verona Doris Lester
- Jesus: Leader of Men (Teachers and Taught Text Books on Religious Education.) 1923 by Verona Doris Lester and Alice Muriel Pullen
- Pictures of God. Hints for Sunday School teaching on the nature of God 1921 by Verona Doris Lester and Alice Muriel Pullen
- Some Problems and Needs of the Intermediate Boy and Girl (Intermediate Department Papers. no. 4.) 1922 by Verona Doris Lester
