= Muriel Lester =

British social reformer and pacifist (1883–1968)

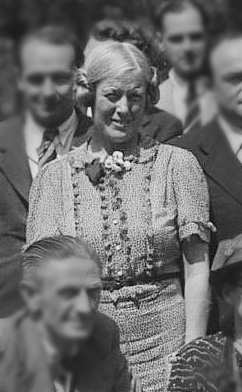
- Born: 9 December 1883; Leytonstone, London, England
- Died: 11 February 1968 (aged 82); Loughton, Essex, England
- Education: Wanstead College, St Leonard's School
- Occupations: Social reformer and international pacifist campaigner
- Organization(s): Kingsley Hall, International Fellowship of Reconciliation, War Resisters' International
- Relatives: Doris Lester (sister); George Hogg (nephew)
- Website: http://www.muriellester.org/

Muriel Lester (9 December 1883 – 11 February 1968) was a British social reformer, international pacifist campaigner, writer and religious nonconformist. She was a founding member and secretary of the International Fellowship of Reconciliation (IFOR) and a member of the International Council of War Resisters' International (WRI).

== Early life ==
Lester was born at Gainsborough Lodge in Leytonstone on 9 December 1883. Her father was Henry Edward Lester, a prominent Baptist businessman, president of the Essex Baptist Union and chairman of West Ham school board. Her mother was Rachel Mary Lester (née Godwin). Lester was their third daughter and enjoyed a relatively privileged upbringing. She was baptised into the Fillebrook Baptist Church in 1898, when she was 15.

In Loughton, Lester lived with her parents at The Grange. She was educated at the progressive day school Wanstead College, then attended St Leonard's School in St Andrews, Scotland.

== Kingsley Hall ==
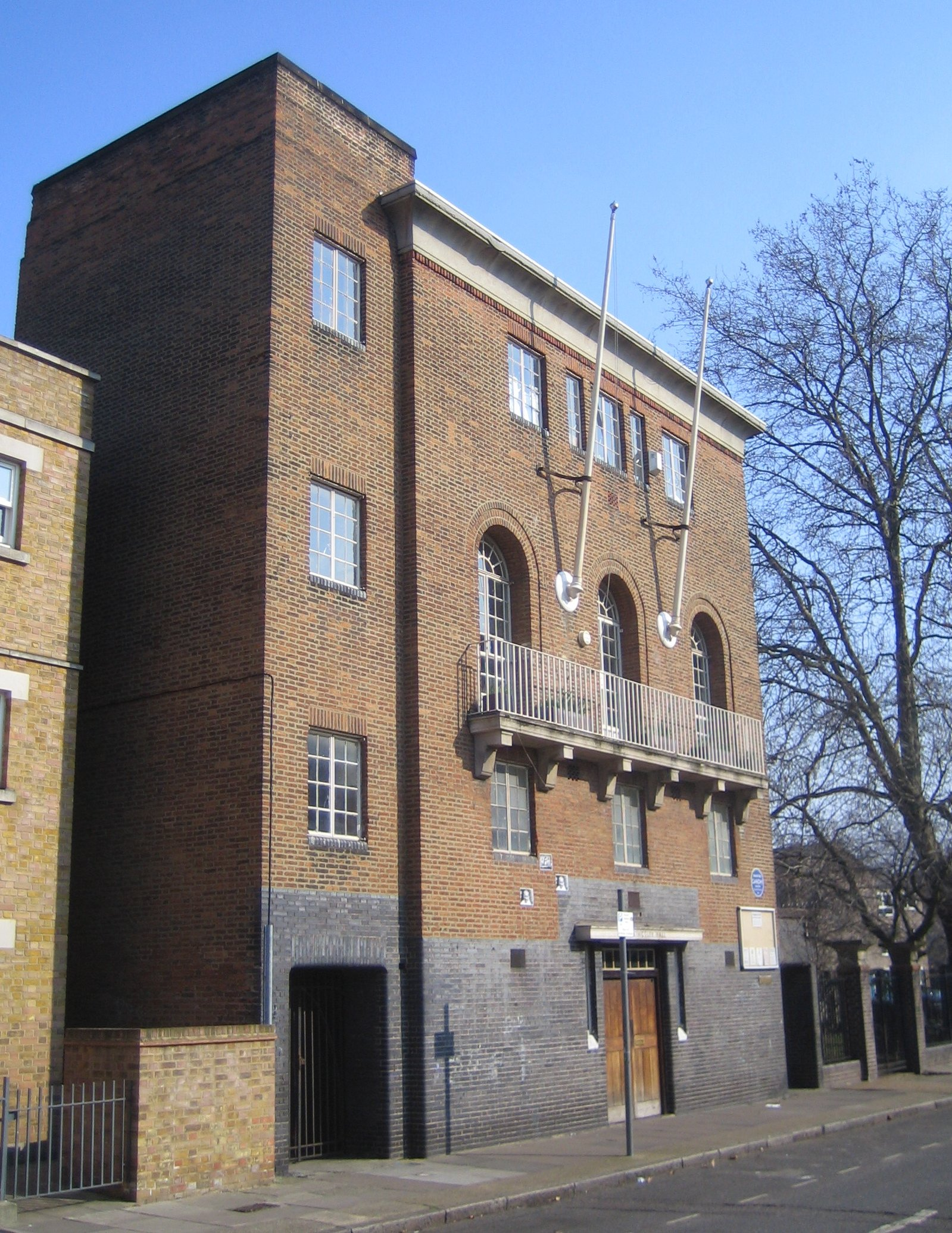
Kingsley Hall

Lester had the ability to study at University and contemplated studying at Cambridge University, but instead chose to live in voluntary poverty and focus on social reform and philanthropy work. Lester visited a factory girls’ club in Bow, a poor district of the East End of London, with her father in 1902 and felt that she needed to help the poor. She became a social worker in the area, moved to live in the community and also lectured widely on poverty. She taught Sunday School at the local Baptist Church.

Along with her sister Verona Doris Lester, Lester established Kingsley Hall on Botolph Road in Bow, in 1915. Kingsley Hall was named after her brother who died had young in 1914, leaving the sisters an inheritance which they used to set up the organisation. It was housed in a building that had formerly been known as Zion Hall and had been used by a "Strict and Particular Baptist congregation."

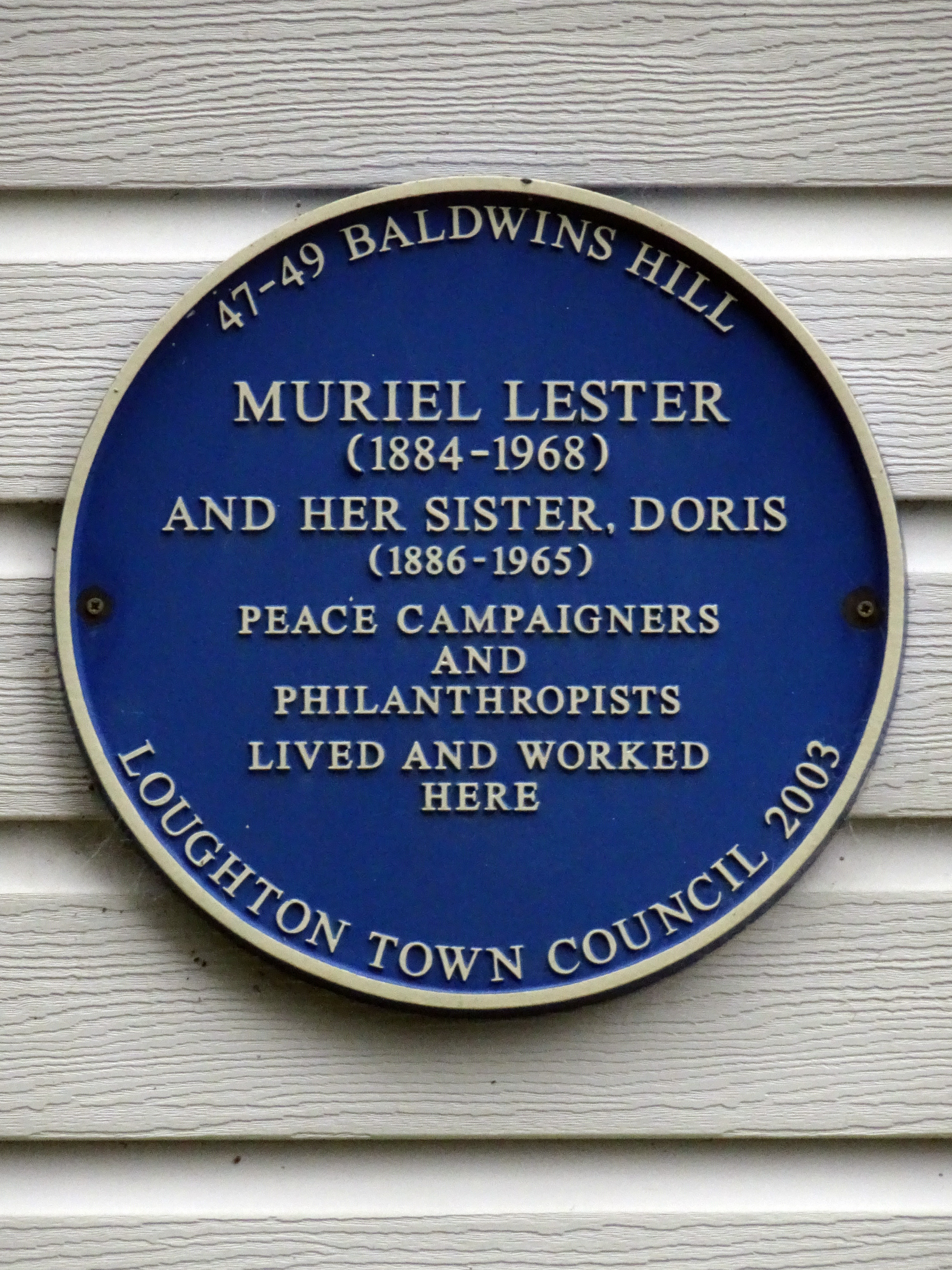
Blue plaque commemorating the Lester sisters in Loughton

The Lester sisters ran a nursery for local children from the building, converting it into London's first purpose-built children's nursery. Kingsley Hall expanded to also become a "People's House" where local residents could study, worship and enjoy social events. A second Kingsley Hall was opened in Dagenham in 1930.

Lester later acquired a wooden house, Rose Cottage, which she renamed Rachel Cottage, and used as a holiday home for East End children. There is a blue plaque to the Lester sisters on the cottage, 49 Baldwins Hill, Loughton, which they acquired after The Grange and Rachel Cottage were sold for flats.

Lester also campaigned for basic provisions to be provided such as milk for children under five.

== Pacifism ==
=== Early pacifism and vegetarianism ===
Lester was influenced by the writings of Leo Tolstoy and his teachings of non-resistance. She shared his ideas with students at Loughton Baptist Union's Sunday School.

After World War I broke out in 1914, Lester campaigned against the war and said that: "the first casualty in every war is truth. War is as outmoded as cannibalism, chattel slavery, blood-feuds and duelling — an insult to God and man — a daily crucifixion of Christ."

Lester also became a vegetarian as a child due to influence from the headteacher's wife at her school. She remained a strict vegetarian throughout her life. In her later years, she rejected a parcel of vitamin pills and liver capsules an American friend had sent her as they were not vegetarian.

=== Friendship with Gandhi ===
In early 1926, Professor Gangulee, the son-in-law of Indian poet and philosopher Rabindranath Tagore and Mrinalini Devi, spoke at Kingsley Hall. He was impressed with Lester's work and invited her to travel to India. Lester met Mahatma Gandhi in 1926 during this first visit to India and they became close friends. She stayed at his ashram in October 1926 and visited Shantiniketan.

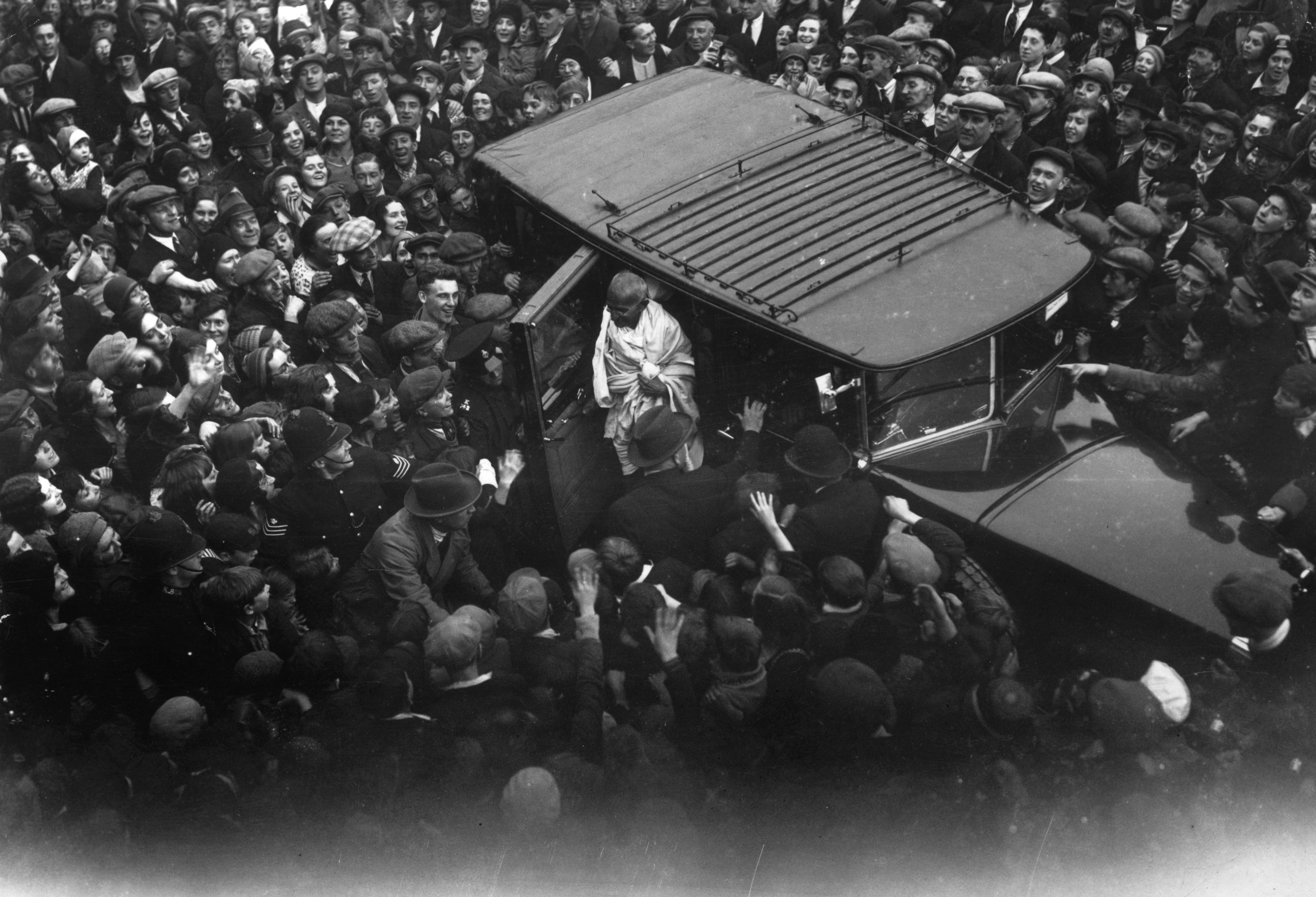
An East End crowd gathers to witness the arrival of Gandhi in 1931

During Gandhi's visit to England from September 1931, to attend the Second Imperial Round Table Conference on India’s future in London, the government provided a suite of rooms at the Hilton Hotel and a fleet of plush cars for him to use. Instead he rejected the arrangements and stayed at Kingsley Hall with his friend Lester for 12 weeks to live among the poor. He was accompanied by his secretary Mahadev Desai, his son Devdas Gandhi and British supporter Mirabehn. Gandhi would sit cross-legged on the floor to receive important visitors. He was warmly greeted by East Enders and local children visited Gandhi and gave him toys for his birthday. Lester noted that he would gently place them on window sills and in carriages during his stay and took them back to India.

Lester also accompanied Gandhi on his tour of earthquake-shaken regions in Bihar, India, on his anti-untouchability tour during 1934. He said Lester "manifested the gospel of reconciliation to people in daily life as did few others" and to her that: "of all my English friends, you are by no means the least."

Kingsley Hall now houses the Gandhi Foundation voluntary organisation.

=== IFOR and international activism ===
Lester was a founding member of the International Fellowship of Reconciliation (IFOR), a Christian pacifist organisation. In 1933, she became Ambassador-At-Large and afterwards Traveling Secretary. In order to devote herself to the Fellowship, she turned over the running of Kingsley Hall to her sister. Lester supported the establishment of new chapters of IFOR across the world and undertook nine international tours in the 1930s, including to the Middle East, China and Japan. In Japan, Lester was known as the "Mother of World Peace." She spoke on her tours against war and the trade in arms and drugs, including the opium trade.

In 1937, Lester travelled with her nephew George Hogg in Japan, from where he continued to Shanghai and later the Chinese hinterlands. He became famous for saving 60 orphaned boys, marching them 1,100km to safety.

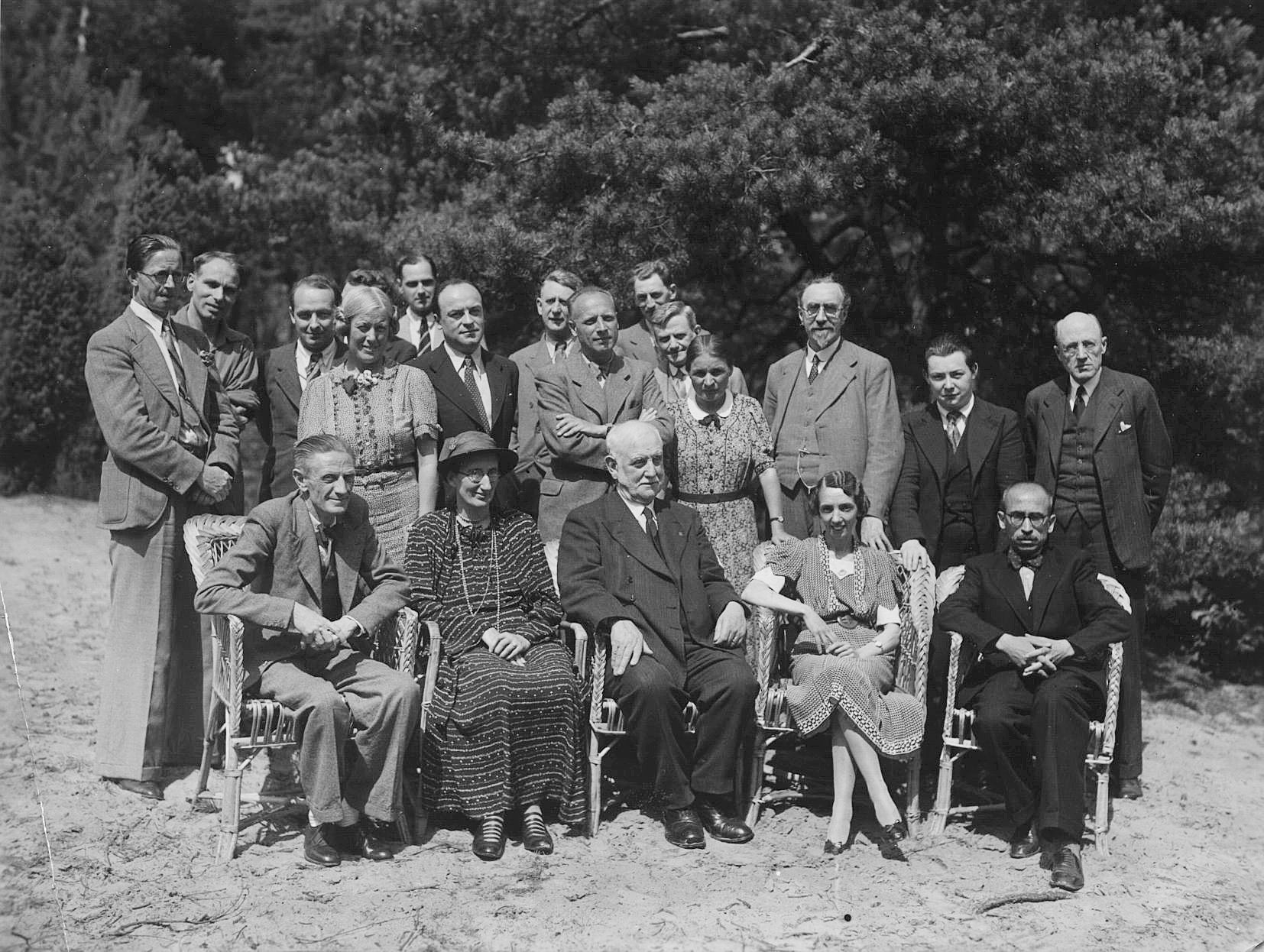
International Council of War Resisters' International (WRI) meeting in Bilthoven, Netherlands in July 1938. Lester is standing, fourth from the left. Other individuals pictured include José Brocca (Spain), Hem Day (Belgium), Olga Fierz (Switzerland), Ruth Fry (Britain), Hagbard Jonassen (Denmark), George Lansbury MP (Britain), Bart de Ligt (Netherlands) and Přemysl Pitter (Czechoslovakia)

During the Spanish Civil War (1936–1939), Lester remained an active pacifist. In Spanish pacifist José Brocca's book White Corpuscles in Europe (1939) the American writer Allan A. Hunter viewed the close of the Spanish Civil War and the opening of World War II from across the Atlantic, and despite the desolate outlook in Europe saw some grounds for optimism in the work of humanitarians including Lester.

Lester was pictured at the International Council of War Resisters' International (WRI) meeting in the Netherlands in July 1938, standing fourth from the left of the photograph.

Lester had a particularly large following in the USA, and contributed to the Fellowship of Reconciliation's magazine Fellowship. She befriended members of the civils rights movement, such as Bayard Rustin. The US government sent agents to report on Lester's speeches, such as in Chicago in 1939. She also toured in Canada, where set met Canadian pacifist and socialist Mildred Fahrni and invited her to work for six months at Kingsley Hall.

In 1941, Lester's anti-war speeches on a tour of the Americas led to her detention in Trinidad. She was forcibly repatriated to Britain, was briefly imprisoned in Holloway Prison and had her passport confiscated. Back in London, with other peace activists she raised funds that the Kingsley Hall used for food, clothing and children's activities.

Lester continued her pacifist work with IFOR after the end of World War II.

== Later life ==
Lester retired from full-time work in 1954. In 1963 she became a Freeman of the Borough of Poplar on her eightieth birthday.

When the American Catholic Dorothy Day visited England whilst travelling to the Pax Conference of 1963, she was asked what she would like to do in London. She replied "the one thing I want to do is see Muriel Lester."

Lester died on 11 February 1968 at her home, Kingsley Cottage, Loughton, Essex. She never married and never had children. She donated her body to science.

== Legacy ==
Lester was recognized as one of the world's leading pacifists. The Nobel Prize organisation believes she may have been nominated for the Nobel Peace Prize at some point prior to the World War II. (Records of nominees were not kept prior to 1939.)

The since renamed vegetarian Muriel Lester Cooperative House at the University of Michigan in Ann Arbor was named after her.

In 2017, Lester was featured in the Clever Essex Campaign, which is aimed to "recognise Essex’s greatest ambassadors."

The Muriel Lester Archive is held at the Bishopsgate Institute, London.

== Autobiographies ==
- It Occurred to Me (Autobiography), Harper Brothers, 1937
- It So Happened, Harper Brothers, 1947

== See also ==
- List of peace activists
