= Family nexus =

Viewpoint held and reinforced by the majority of family members

In psychology, a family nexus is a common viewpoint held and reinforced by the majority of family members regarding events in the family and relationships with the world. The term was coined by R. D. Laing, who believed that this nexus "exists only insofar as each person incarnates the nexus ... maintaining his interiorization of the group unchanged." The concept is similar to the "family psychic apparatus (FPA) ... an unconscious psychic basis, common to members of the family group, inducing a specific experience of belonging."

== Laing and schizophrenia ==
Laing was particularly interested in schizophrenia, which he believed could be understood if seen from the viewpoint of the person concerned. He saw how a powerful family nexus could victimize one member, usually a child, who found themselves in the position of not being able to speak or even think the truth without being chastised by the group, who often had vested interests in perpetuating the family myth and excluding reality. In Laing's opinion, "what is called a psychotic episode in one person can often be understood as a crisis of a peculiar kind in the inter-experience of the nexus."

Often described as part of the "antipsychiatry" movement, Laing strove to see things in terms of existentialism, emphasizing the difference between "being" or "being in this world" and being alive. "An issue essential to an existential analysis of action is to what extent and in what ways the agent is disclosed or concealed ... in and through action." Being in the existentialist sense means being an object for others and having others as objects, in other words, carrying a model in our heads of all the significant others in our lives. This model provided the motivation for many of our thoughts and actions, and without it we "cease to be" in a very real sense.

It is this need for others, in order to "be," that makes us afraid to contradict a family nexus, risking family exclusion. However, "to a number of people the phantasy system of the nexus is a lousy hell, not an enchanting spell, and they want out ... But within the phantasy of the nexus, to leave is an act of ingratitude, or cruelty, or suicide, or murder ... Herein is the risk of defeat and madness." The distortion involved in not going against the nexus can force wrong thinking—leading to "not being in reality," which Laing saw as the essence of schizophrenia; and for Laing, "one of the most important questions, therefore, is whether such mistrust of her 'feelings' and the testimony of others arises from persistent inconsistencies within an original nexus."

== Closed nexus and double bind ==
Laing and his colleagues suggested that a family nexus included both immediate family and extra-familial people closely associated with the family and its worldview. a[8] Laing argued that a closed nexus would use its energy so as to unconsciously block out any threats to its identity, keeping all interchanges at a boring, repetitive level. Building on Kleinian accounts of social phantasy systems and the sense of unquestioned reality they can generate, Laing argued that within such systems patterns of communication were multi-layered and deceptive.

He also used W. R. Bion's account of how a group's basic assumptions could radiate "long silences, sighs of boredom, movements of discomfort ... the hostility of the individuals was being contributed to the group anonymously". As his associate Joseph Berke put it, in such a nexus, "a unique pattern of communication could be made out. People did not talk to each other, but at each other, and tangentially, not directly. ... What people said was often contradicted by the way they said it (tone of voice and/or facial and bodily movements)."

Further light was shed on such interactions by Gregory Bateson's concept of the double bind, "a situation in which contradictory demands are being put upon a child (or patient) in such a way that there is no avenue of escape or challenge". Laing considered that the concept allowed a completely new understanding of what a familial environment could entail: "this paradigm of an insoluble 'can't win' situation, specifically destructive of self-identity" greatly illuminated the way the subject's "disturbed pattern of communication ... [was] a reflection of, and reaction to, the disturbed and disturbing pattern characterizing his or her family of origin." In such a light, he considered that "mental illness" might be the outcome of a problematic configuration of a family nexus more than a necessary result of the nexus itself: in the words of Charles Rycroft, the psychotic is "the overt casualty of a deeply concealed family tragedy ... the end-result of complex and skew[ed] interactions within his family."

As Laing was careful to point out, however, it was not "a matter of laying the blame at anyone's door. The untenable position, the 'can't win' double-bind, the situation of checkmate, is by definition not obvious to the protagonists ... The man at the bottom of the heap may be being crushed and suffocated to death without anyone noticing, much less intending it".

== Collier's criticism ==
Andrew Collier has commented on Laing's dilemma, which Laing himself seemed never to properly identify. In much of his writing, Laing assumed an uncorrupted natural state for the human mind and tended to condemn society for causing mental illness, in rather (early) Marxist terms. He saw schizophrenia as a possible healing process, a way of working through things, back to normality. Collier suggests that there is no uncorrupted state, no normality; rather, as social animals we all need to incorporate others into a nexus in order to "b." We must all perhaps be "mad" to some extent if we are to function in society, rather than as loners, but we must be uniformly mad. The nature of the madman's "must" remains unestablished.

== Therapy ==
Psychotherapy today comes in many forms, following different schools of thought. Psychoanalysis emphasises childhood experience and left-over feelings, though Freud did point to the role of society in his later works like Civilization andIits Discontents. Family therapy concentrates on bringing families together and encouraging them to work out their interactions, but it might (depending on its theoretical orientation) offer little or no support to the victim of the family nexus, who may then be punished for anything he dares to reveal or hint a, and (lacking a support network) submit to silent intimidation in family therapy, rather than risk exclusion and the "ceasing to be" that follows. The alert family therapist will "avoid taking the family's side ... or the scapegoat's. You mustn't take anyone's side because then you'd be joining in the blaming ... You've got to treat the family as a system, without blaming anyone ... you need to make them all feel supported."

== See also ==
- Dysfunctional family
- Gregory Bateson
- Identified patient
- Narcissistic parent
- Scapegoat
