= Asylum (1972 documentary film) =

1972 British film by Peter Robinson

- Release date: 1972
- Country: United Kingdom
- Language: English

Asylum is a 1972 documentary film written and directed by Peter Robinson about a therapeutic community for people with schizophrenia at Philadelphia Association Communities in London. It features the co-founders of the community, Leon Redler and the psychiatrist R. D. Laing.
