= Asylum seeker (disambiguation) =

An asylum seeker is a person who makes a request for refuge, usually in a foreign country.

Asylum seeker(s) may also refer to:

- Asylum Seekers (film), a 2009 black comedy film
- Hellboy: Asylum Seeker, a 2003 video game based on the comic book series Hellboy
- The Asylum Seeker, a novel by Dutch author published in 2003

== See also ==
- Seeking Asylum (film), a 1979 Italian comedy film
