= Joseph Berke =

American-born psychotherapist (1939–2021)

- Born: Joseph H. Berke; January 17, 1939; Newark, New Jersey, U.S.
- Died: January 11, 2021 (aged 81); London, England
- Scientific career
- Fields: Psychiatry

Joseph H. Berke (January 17, 1939 – January 11, 2021) was an American-born psychotherapist, author, and lecturer.

== Early life and education ==
Berke was born on January 17, 1939, in Newark, New Jersey. He studied at Columbia College of Columbia University and graduated from the Albert Einstein College of Medicine in New York. Berke moved to London in 1965 where he worked with R. D. Laing in the 1960s when the Philadelphia Association was being established. Berke was a resident at Kingsley Hall, where he helped Mary Barnes, a nurse who had been diagnosed with schizophrenia, emerge from madness.

== Career ==
Barnes later became an artist and writer. A stage play based on the book that Berke and Barnes wrote together (Mary Barnes: Two Accounts of a Journey Through Madness) was adapted as a stage play by David Edgar. In 2014, a film adaptation of the book was under consideration. Berke collaborated on a number of projects with R. D. Laing, including the Dialectics of Liberation international conference in London, July 15–30, 1967, where he was the principal organizer. Berke worked as a psychoanalytic psychotherapist for individuals and families. He was the co-founder of the Arbours Association in London in 1970, and the founder and director of the Arbours Crisis Centre (1973-2010) in London. He was the author of many articles and books on psychological, social, and religious themes.

== Death and legacy ==
Berke died in London on January 11, 2021, at the age of 81. The majority of Berke's archive is held at Wellcome Collection; personal papers of Berke including materials relating to the Institute of Phenomenological Studies, Research Committee on Cannabis, Fire Magazine and Arbours Association. Alongside these materials are the professional papers of Berke including notes for the publications Paranoia and Persecution and Beyond Madness. Within the collection is a series of correspondence regarding the Dialectics of Liberation Congress 1967.

== Selected bibliography ==
Berke was the author of many articles and books on psychological, social, political and religious themes, including:

- Mary Barnes: Two Accounts of a Journey through Madness (with Mary Barnes) (2002) 3rd Edition, New York: Other Press
- The Cannabis Experience: An Interpretative Study of the Effects of Marijuana and Hashish (with Calvin Hernton) (1974), London: Peter Owen
- I Haven't Had To Go Mad Here (1979) Pelican Books
- The Tyranny of Malice: Exploring the Dark Side of Character and Culture (1988) NY: Summit Books
- Sanctuary: The Arbours Experience of Alternative Community Care (co-editor)(1995) London: Process Press
- Even Paranoids Have Enemies: New Perspectives on Paranoia and Persecution (co-editor).(1998)London: Routledge
- Beyond Madness: PsychoSocial Interventions in Psychosis (co-editor)(2001) London: Jessica Kingsley

His recent books include: Malice Through the Looking Glass (2009) 2nd Edition, London: Teva Publications Centers of Power: The Convergence of Psychoanalysis and Kabbalah (with Stanley Schneider)(2008) NY: Jason Aronson Why I Hate You and You Hate Me: The Interplay of Envy, Greed, Jealousy and Narcissism (2013) London: Karnac Books and The Hidden Freud: His Hassidic Roots (2015) London: Karnac Books

== See also ==
- David Smail (psychologist)
