= Asylum (magazine) =

UK magazine

Asylum is a quarterly not-for-profit publication described by its creators as a "forum for debate about mental health and psychiatry". It is based in the UK, and was first published in 1986. It was established by Alec Jenner, professor of psychiatry, Phil Virden, executive editor for the first six years, Lyn Bigwood, among others. Terence McLaughlin was the magazine's executive editor from 2000 to 2007. The current editor is Hel Spandler. Inspired by the Democratic Psychiatry movement in Italy, the first issue contained a long interview with R. D. Laing.

It is currently published by PCCS books and is run by an editorial collective of unpaid volunteers. The magazine contains articles, cartoons, news and comments and a creative writing section, covering controversial issues around psychiatry. Anyone can submit content to the magazine, but the Editorial Collective claims to "particularly focus on content that would not be found in the mainstream press". The magazine was re-launched in 2010, after a short break. The Magazine runs conferences, public meetings and other events, such as Asylum reading groups. There was a London group formed in 2012.
