= David Smail (psychologist) =

British clinical psychologist

David John Smail (23 April 1938 – 3 August 2014) was a British clinical psychologist who was a proponent of a social materialist explanation of psychological distress.

== Life and work ==
Smail was born in Putney, London, and was raised in Epsom and Wimbledon. After graduating from University College London with a degree in Philosophy and Psychology, he worked briefly in market research before moving into clinical psychology; training at Horton Hospital in Epsom and then at Claybury Hospital in Essex (circa 1961). He obtained a doctorate in philosophy on the subject of guilt and aggression in 1965 from University College London. He was head of clinical psychology services in Nottingham (UK) until 1993 and he retired from the NHS in 1998. He held the honorary post of Special Professor in Clinical Psychology, University of Nottingham, from 1979 to 2000 and was a founding member of the Midlands Psychology Group.

Smail wrote several books on the subject of psychotherapy, emphasizing the extent to which society is often responsible for personal distress. Critical of the claims made by psychotherapy, he suggests that it only works to the extent that the therapist becomes a friend of the patient, providing encouragement and support. Much distress, he says, results from current conflicts, not past ones, and in any case, damage done probably cannot be undone, though we may learn to live with it. He doubts whether 'catharsis', the process whereby it is supposed that understanding past events makes them less painful, really works. The assumption that depression, or any other form of mental distress, is caused by something within the person that can be fixed, is he argued, without foundation. He could thus be regarded as part of the 'anti-psychiatry' movement, along with R. D. Laing and Thomas Szasz, but where Laing emphasised family nexus as making psychosis understandable, Smail emphasises 'Interest' and power in relation to more everyday distress. These are integral to Western society, and, he suggests, considered out of bounds by most psychotherapists, who are themselves both constrained and complicit in protecting their own interests.

Smail also attacks the common conceptions of 'happiness' and 'relationships', pointing out that these are by-products of real life, and should not be ends in themselves. He suggests that taking part in real joint efforts is what seems to make people forget themselves and become truly happy, but he also takes a despairing view of how modern society makes it hard to see what the real point of these efforts might be for many people.

In Taking Care – An Alternative to Therapy (1987) Smail, after many years as an active psychotherapist, cast doubt on the supposed mechanisms by which therapy is claimed to be effective. While he does not condemn therapy as useless, he suspected that it is only effective to the extent that the therapist becomes a true friend to the client, involved in their world. Catharsis, the supposed process by which people are 'cured' of 'mental illness' once they gain 'insight' into their problems, is illusory, and therapists are to a large extent magicians involved in wishful thinking. In this book he recommends that we 'take care' in our involvement in life, and of others we are involved with.

In later books, such as his Power, Interest, and Psychology, he has much more to say of the embodied nature of individuals in society, and the extent to which we have any control at all over our lives. Interest and power, he says, are what determine events in our lives more than we are allowed to acknowledge, individuals generally have limited agency, and 'willpower' is a fiction. This book began as Power, Responsibility and Freedom, freely available on the internet, and Smail had some interesting observations on the relative merits of a (living) internet versus 'proper' (dead) publication. The former, he suspects, is not necessarily conducive to the study of a detailed work, and the demands of the medium for constant updates can be tiresome, especially when there is no real evidence that the work is reaching its intended readership.

Smail died on 3 August 2014 at the age of 76.

=== Three laws ===
In a sidebar in Power Responsibility and Freedom Smail posits three laws that if understood fully would save everyone a lot of anxiety:

Law 1 "Absolutely everybody wants to be liked".

Law 2 "Everyone feels different inside (less confident, less able, etc.) from how they infer other people to feel".

Law 3 "Few honest and courageous people who have achieved anything of real value in life do not feel a fraud much of the time".

=== Impact ===
Smail's work and lectures have been influential in the theory and practice of community psychology, with a focus on 'outsight' rather than 'insight', ideas taken up since his death by The Midlands Psychology Group: "Psychology needs to stop looking inside the head of each troubled individual that seeks its help and turn its gaze outwards. The causes of distress are not to be found in faulty or dysfunctional brains, but in the often toxic family circumstances, community settings, the workplace and the wider social world, with all its inequalities, injustices and environmental breakdown."

== Selected works ==
- The Treatment of Mental Illness – Science, Faith and the Therapeutic Personality. University of London Press, 1969.
- Psychotherapy: A Personal Approach. [1978] Dent, 1982 (revised). ISBN 978-0-460-02194-4
- Illusion and Reality – The Meaning of Anxiety. [1984] Constable, 1997 (revised). ISBN 978-0-460-02278-1
- Taking Care – An Alternative to Therapy. [1987] Constable, 1998. ISBN 978-0-09-477420-9
- The Origins of Unhappiness – A New Understanding of Personal Distress. [1993] Constable, 1999 (revised). ISBN 978-0-09-479340-8
- How to Survive Without Psychotherapy. [1996] Constable, 1998 (revised). ISBN 978-0-09-478480-2
- The Nature of Unhappiness. Robinson, 2001. ISBN 1-84119-350-X
- Why Therapy Doesn't Work. Robinson, 2001. ISBN 978-1-84119-350-2
- Power, Interest and Psychology – Elements of a Social Materialist Understanding of Distress. PCCS Books, 2005. ISBN 978-1-898059-71-4

== See also ==
- R. D. Laing
- Thomas Szasz
- Existential Therapy
