= Heaton process =

Process for producing steel by decarburizing pig iron

The Heaton process is an 18th-century process for producing steel by combining nitrates with molten (cast- or pig-) iron feedstock, decarburizing that to steel.

== Inventor ==
John Heaton developed this process using nitrates to oxidize the 2-5% carbon in cast iron and convert it to steel.

== Process ==
In 1869, when John Heaton published 'Heaton's Process for the Treatment of Cast Iron and the Manufacture of Steel', cast iron was a readily available material, but converting it to steel was a slow, expensive, laborious process. At the time, there was an already-known laboratory-scale process of adding "nitre" to cast iron in order to produce oxygen and burn off the carbon, producing steel. John Heaton formalized a process (specifying sodium nitrate instead of potassium) and designed equipment which made the comingling of the nitrate and the liquid cast iron reliable and repeatable, something that had until then been impractical. Combined, these improvements became the Heaton process. Another English metallurgist, Henry Bessemer had just created the Bessemer process of blowing air or pure oxygen through liquid cast iron to burn off the carbon.

Heaton conducted a long and protracted legal battle with Henry Bessemer who believed that the Heaton Process was included in the Bessemer process through some early patent applications. Eventually the courts found in favor it Heaton, but it was Bessemer's process that won out in the end.

== Adoption ==
As of 1869 it was not clear, if it was "sufficiently economical" to justify the conversion of existing plants. It was soon eclipsed by the Bessemer process.

== See also ==
- Bessemer process
- Puddling
- Potting and stamping
