= Aaron Esterson =

British psychiatrist (1923–1999)

- Born: 23 September 1923 (age 102)
- Died: 15 April 1999 (aged 75)
- Education: Glasgow University (MD)
- Occupation: Psychiatrist
- Known for: Founding the Philadelphia Association

Aaron Esterson (23 September 1923 – 15 April 1999) was a British psychiatrist, practising in Glasgow.

He was one of the founders of the Philadelphia Association along with R. D. Laing.

Born in Glasgow in 1923, Esterson served in the Royal Navy as a wireless operator on a minesweeper during World War II. After the war, he earned an M.D. from Glasgow University in 1951. He first was a general practitioner, then became a psychiatrist in 1954, after which he practiced in British mental hospitals and psychiatric units. In 1962, he established a private practice as an existential psychoanalyst and family therapist.

== Bibliography ==
- Laing, R.D. & Esterson, A. (1958) Collusive Function of Pairing in Analytic Groups, British Journal of Medical Psychology
- Laing, R.D. & Esterson, A. (1964) Sanity, Madness, and the Family: Families of Schizophrenics. Penguin Books. ISBN 0-14-021157-8
- Esterson, A., Cooper D. and Laing, R.D. (1965) Results of family-oriented therapy with hospitalised schizophrenics, British Medical Journal
- Leaves of Spring: Study in the Dialectics of Madness (Stud. in Existentialism S) (1970) Tavistock Publications ISBN 0-422-73210-9
- The Leaves of Spring: Study in the Dialectics of Madness (Pelican S.) (1972) Penguin Books Ltd ISBN 0-14-021458-5
