= John Heaton (metallurgist) =

Engineer (b. 1818, d. 1897)

- Born: 1818; Wigan, England
- Died: 1897
- Citizenship: UK
- Occupation: Inventor
- Organization: Institute of Mechanical Engineers
- Notable work: (1868) Heaton's Process for the Treatment of Cast Iron and the Manufacture of Steel
- Spouse: Catherine Heaton
- Children: John Samuel Heaton, Elizabeth M. Heaton
- Parents: Thomas Heaton (father); Isabella Heaton (mother)

John Heaton (1818–1897) was a 19th-century mechanical engineer who lived in England. Government documents refer to him at different times as a civil, mechanical and mining engineer, reflecting the breadth of his work. He is mainly known for inventing the Heaton process, a way to convert cast iron into steel, and his subsequent legal battles with fellow Englishman Henry Bessemer, who had developed a different method for the same conversion. He later obtained a patent regarding efficiency improvements in steam boilers.

== Life ==
- The Nottinghamshire Birth-Marriage-Death records show he was born (or baptised) in 1818.
- In 1868 he received a UK patent for the Heaton process.
- In 1868 he was nominated for membership of the Institute of Mechanical Engineers and was then accepted.
- Between 1868 and 1869 he conducted, and won, a protracted legal battle with Henry Bessemer. Bessemer believed that the Heaton process was included in the Bessemer process through some early patent applications.
- In 1870 he obtained a second patent for "Improvements in Obtaining Motive Power", making steam boilers produce vapour more efficiently by first dissolving carbon dioxide in the water to be boiled.
- He appears in the 1871 and 1881 census documents.
- The UK Birth-Marriage-Death records show that he died in 1897.

== Heaton process ==
When Heaton published "Heaton's Process for the Treatment of Cast Iron and the Manufacture of Steel" in 1869, cast iron was a readily available material. However, converting it to steel was a slow, expensive and laborious process known as 'puddling'. Another English metallurgist, Henry Bessemer, had just created the Bessemer process, which entailed blowing air or pure oxygen through liquid cast iron to burn off the carbon. At the time, there was another laboratory-scale process of adding potassium nitrate to cast iron to produce oxygen and burn off the carbon, thereby producing steel. Heaton formalized a process using sodium nitrate (instead of potassium) and designed equipment that made the commingling of the nitrate and the liquid cast iron reliable and repeatable. Combined, these improvements became the Heaton process.
