= The Divided Self =

1960 book by R. D. Laing

The Divided Self: An Existential Study in Sanity and Madness is a study in existentialist phenomenology written R. D. Laing and published by the Tavistock Institute in 1960. This was Laing's first book, written when he was 30 years old, and has been described as probably his best.
