= R. D. Laing =

Unorthodox Scottish psychiatrist (1927–1989)

Ronald David Laing
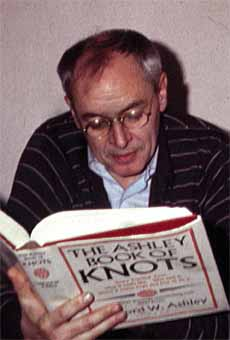
- Laing in 1983, perusing The Ashley Book of Knots (1944)
- Born: Ronald David Laing; 7 October 1927; Govanhill, Glasgow, Scotland
- Died: 23 August 1989 (aged 61); Saint-Tropez, France
- Occupation: Psychiatrist
- Known for: Medical model
- Spouse(s): Anne Hearne (m. 1952; div. 1966) Jutta Werner (m. 1974; div. 1986)
- Children: 10
- Scientific career
- Fields: Psychiatry

Ronald David Laing (7 October 1927 – 23 August 1989) was a Scottish psychiatrist who wrote extensively on mental illness, particularly psychosis and schizophrenia. Politically, Laing was regarded as a thinker of the New Left. He has been theatrically portrayed by Mike Maran, Alan Cox, Billy Mack, and David Tennant in the 2017 film Mad to Be Normal.

Laing's views on the causes and treatment of psychopathological phenomena were influenced by his study of existential philosophy and ran counter to the chemical and electroshock methods that had become psychiatric orthodoxy. Laing took the expressed feelings of the individual patient or client as valid descriptions of personal experience rather than simply as symptoms of mental illness. Although associated in the public mind with the anti-psychiatry movement, he rejected the label. Laing regarded schizophrenia as the normal psychological adjustment to a dysfunctional social context.

== Early years ==
Laing was born in the Govanhill district of Glasgow on 7 October 1927, the only child of civil engineer David Park MacNair Laing and Amelia Glen Laing (née Kirkwood). Laing described his parents, particularly his mother, as being somewhat anti-social, and demanding the maximum achievement from him. Adrian, his son and biographer, discounted much of Laing's published childhood account, and an obituary by an acquaintance of Laing asserted that, of his parents, "the full truth he told only to a few close friends".

He was educated initially at Sir John Neilson Cuthbertson Public School and after four years transferred to Hutchesons' Grammar School. Described variously as clever, competitive or precocious, he studied classics, particularly philosophy, including through reading books from the local library. Small and slightly built, Laing participated in distance running; he was also a musician, being made an Associate of the Royal College of Music. He studied medicine at the University of Glasgow. During his time in Glasgow, he set up a "Socratic Club", of which the philosopher Bertrand Russell agreed to be president. Laing failed his final exams. In a partial autobiography, Wisdom, Madness and Folly, Laing said he felt remarks he made under the influence of alcohol at a university function had offended the staff and led to him being failed on every subject including some he was sure he had passed. After spending six months working in a psychiatric unit, Laing passed the re-sits in 1951 to qualify as a medical doctor.

== Career ==
Laing spent a couple of years as a psychiatrist in the British Army Psychiatric Unit at Netley, where, as he later recalled, those trying to fake schizophrenia to get a lifelong disability pension were likely to get more than they had bargained for as insulin shock therapy was being used. In 1953, Laing returned to Glasgow, participated in an existentialism-oriented discussion group, and worked at the Glasgow Royal Mental Hospital. The hospital was influenced by David Henderson's school of thought, which may have exerted an unacknowledged influence on Laing; he became the youngest consultant in the country. Laing's colleagues characterised him as "conservative" for his opposition to electroconvulsive therapy and the new drugs that were being introduced.

In 1956, Laing went to train on a grant at the Tavistock Clinic in London, widely known as a centre for the study and practice of psychotherapy (particularly psychoanalysis). At this time, he was associated with John Bowlby, D. W. Winnicott and his training analyst, Charles Rycroft. He remained at the Tavistock Clinic until 1964. In 1965, Laing and a group of colleagues, most notably Sid Briskin, created the Philadelphia Association and started a psychiatric community project at Kingsley Hall, where patients and therapists lived together. The Norwegian author Axel Jensen contacted Laing at Kingsley Hall after reading his book The Divided Self, which had been given to him by Noel Cobb. Laing treated Jensen, and subsequently, they became close friends. Laing often visited Jensen on board his ship Shanti Devi, which was his home in Stockholm.

In 1967, Laing appeared on the BBC programme Your Witness, chaired by Ludovic Kennedy, on which, alongside Jonathan Aitken and G.P. Ian Dunbar, he argued for the legalisation of cannabis in the first live television debate on the subject. In the same years, his views were explored in the television play In Two Minds, written by David Mercer. In October 1972, Laing met Arthur Janov, author of the popular book The Primal Scream. Although Laing found Janov modest and unassuming, he considered him a "jig man" (someone who knows a lot about a little). Laing sympathized with Janov but regarded his primal therapy as a lucrative business—one which required no more than obtaining a suitable space and letting people "hang it all out". Inspired by the work of American psychotherapist Elizabeth Fehr, Laing began to develop a team offering "rebirthing workshops" in which one designated person chooses to re-experience the struggle of trying to break out of the birth canal represented by the remaining members of the group who surround him or her.

== Laing and anti-psychiatry ==
If the human race survives, future men will, I suspect, look back on our enlightened epoch as a veritable age of Darkness. They will presumably be able to savour the irony of the situation with more amusement than we can extract from it. The laugh’s on us. They will see that what we call "schizophrenia" was one of the forms in which, often through quite ordinary people, the light began to break through the cracks in our all-too-closed minds.

— R. D. Laing, The Politics of Experience, p. 107

Laing was seen as an important figure in the anti-psychiatry movement, along with David Cooper, although he never denied the value of treating mental distress. He also challenged psychiatric diagnosis itself, arguing that the diagnosis of a mental disorder contradicted accepted medical procedure: the diagnosis was made on the basis of behaviour or conduct of an examination, and tests that traditionally precede the diagnosis of such viable pathologies as broken bones or pneumonia occurred after the diagnosis of mental disorder, if at all. Hence, according to Laing, psychiatry was founded on a false epistemology: illness diagnosed by conduct but treated biologically. Laing maintained that schizophrenia was "a theory not a fact"; he believed leading medical geneticists did not accept the models of genetically inherited schizophrenia being promoted by biologically based psychiatry. He rejected the "medical model of mental illness"—according to Laing, diagnosis of mental illness did not follow a traditional medical model—and this led him to question the use of medication such as antipsychotics by psychiatry. His attitude to recreational drugs was quite different; privately, he advocated an anarchy of experience. Politically, Laing was regarded as a thinker of the New Left.

== Works ==
In 1913, psychiatrist and philosopher Karl Jaspers had pronounced in his work General Psychopathology that many of the symptoms of mental illness (and particularly of delusions) were "un-understandable", and were therefore worthy of little consideration except as a sign of some other underlying primary disorder. Then, in 1956, Gregory Bateson and his colleagues Donald Jackson and Jay Haley articulated a theory of schizophrenia as stemming from double bind situations where a person receives different or contradictory messages.

The perceived symptoms of schizophrenia were therefore an expression of this distress, and should be valued as a cathartic and transformative experience. Laing argued a similar account for psychoses: that the strange behavior and seemingly confused speech of people undergoing a psychotic episode were ultimately understandable as an attempt to communicate worries and concerns, often in situations where this was not possible or not permitted. Laing stressed the role of society, and particularly the family, in the development of "madness" (his term). Laing saw psychopathology as being seated not in biological or psychic organs—whereby environment is relegated to playing at most an accidental role as immediate trigger of disease (the "stress diathesis model" of the nature and causes of psychopathology)—but rather in the social cradle, the urban home, that cultivates it. This re-evaluation of the locus of the disease process, and consequent shift in forms of treatment, was in stark contrast to psychiatric orthodoxy. Laing was revolutionary in valuing the content of psychotic behaviour and speech as a valid expression of distress, albeit wrapped in an enigmatic language of personal symbolism which is meaningful only from within the subject's situation. Laing expanded the view of the "double bind" hypothesis put forth by Bateson and his team, and came up with a new concept to describe the highly complex situation that unfolds in the process of "going mad": an "incompatible knot". Laing never denied the existence of mental illness, but viewed it in a radically different light from his contemporaries. For Laing, mental illness could be a transformative episode whereby the process of undergoing mental distress was compared to a shamanic journey. The traveller could return from the journey with important insights, and may have become (in the views of Laing and his followers) a wiser and more grounded person as a result.

In The Divided Self (1960), Laing contrasts the experience of the "ontologically secure" person with that of a person who "cannot take the realness, aliveness, autonomy and identity of himself and others for granted" and who consequently contrives strategies to avoid "losing his self". This concept is used to develop a psychodynamic model of the mind to explain psychosis and schizophrenia. Laing's theories resemble later ideas about self-disorder as a core characteristic of schizophrenia. In The Self and Others (1961), Laing's definition of normality shifted somewhat. Laing also wrote poetry and his poetry publications include Knots (1970, published by Penguin) and Sonnets (1979, published by Michael Joseph). Laing appears, alongside his son Adam, on the 1980 album Miniatures – a sequence of fifty-one tiny masterpieces edited by Morgan Fisher, performing the song "Tipperary".

The Divided Self was listed by the David Bowie Estate as one of David Bowie's top 100 books he had read.

== Personal life ==
In his early life, Laing's father, David, an electrical engineer who had served in the Royal Flying Corps, seems often to have come to blows with his own brother, and had a breakdown himself for three months when Laing was a teenager. His mother Amelia, according to Adrian Laing had "an inability to express affection to... her only child". Laing was troubled by his own personal problems, suffering from both episodic alcoholism and clinical depression, according to his self-diagnosis in a BBC Radio interview with Anthony Clare in 1983, although he reportedly was free of both in the years before his death. These admissions were to have serious consequences for Laing as they formed part of the case against him by the General Medical Council which led him to voluntarily withdraw his name from the Medical Register on 20 May 1987.

Laing fathered six sons and four daughters by four women. After his rise as a celebrity, Laing left his first wife Anne Hearne, a former nurse (m. 1952–1966) and their five children, and moved into Kingsley Hall. Subsequently, he married German graphic designer Jutta Werner (m. 1974–1986) with whom he fathered three children. His ninth child, Benjamin, with German therapist Sue Sünkel, was born in 1984. In 1988, Laing's partner until his death, Marguerite, gave birth to his tenth child, Charles. Laing died 19 months later of a heart attack at the age of 61 while playing tennis.

In September 2008, his lawyer son Adrian, said, "It was ironic that my father became well known as a family psychiatrist, when, in the meantime, he had nothing to do with his own family." His second daughter Susan died in 1976, aged 21, of leukemia. His third daughter Karen was born in Glasgow in 1955 and became a psychotherapist. Adam, his oldest son by his second marriage, who had been in an increasingly melancholic and fragile state of mind, was found dead in May 2008 in a tent on the island of Formentera. He had died of a heart attack, aged 41. R.D Laing's fourth daughter from his second marriage, Natascha, died of cancer in 2018 aged 48.

== Death and legacy ==
Laing died on 23 August 1989 at the age of 61 from a heart attack while playing tennis in Saint-Tropez. He was described as a "pioneer on schizophrenia". In 1965, Laing had co-founded, along with Sid Briskin and others, the UK charity the Philadelphia Association concerned with the understanding and relief of mental suffering, which he also chaired. His work influenced the wider movement of therapeutic communities, operating in less "confrontational" (in a Laingian perspective) psychiatric settings. Other organizations created in a Laingian tradition are the Arbours Association, the New School of Psychotherapy and Counselling in London, and the R. D. Laing in the 21st Century Symposium, held annually at Esalen Institute, where Laing frequently taught.

== Films, sound recordings, and plays about Laing ==
- Ah, Sunflower (1967). Short film by Robert Klinkert and Iain Sinclair, filmed around the Dialectics of Liberation conference and featuring Laing, Allen Ginsberg, Stokely Carmichael and others.
- Cain’s Film (1969). Short film by Jamie Wadhawan on Alexander Trocchi, featuring other counter-cultural figures in London at the time including Laing, William Burroughs and Davy Graham.
- Family Life (1971). Reworking of The Wednesday Play: In Two Minds (1967) that "explored the issue of schizophrenia and the ideas of the radical psychiatrist R. D. Laing". Both were directed by Ken Loach from scripts by David Mercer.
- Asylum (1972). Documentary directed by Peter Robinson showing Laing's psychiatric community project where patients and therapists lived together. Laing also appears in the film.
- Knots (1975). Film adapted from Laing's 1970 book and Edward Petherbridge's play.
- How Does It Feel? (1976). Documentary on physical senses and creativity featuring Laing, Joseph Beuys, David Hockney, Elkie Brooks, Michael Tippett and Richard Gregory.
- Birth with R. D. Laing (1978). Documentary on the "institutionalization of childbirth practices in Western society".
- The play Mary Barnes by David Edgar (1978) was a theatrical indictment of traditional psychiatry, chronicling the six-year journey through the illness of Barnes, a middle-aged former nurse diagnosed as schizophrenic, kept in padded cells and drugged and shocked into numbness. Set in 1960s London and based on the personal accounts of Barnes and therapist Joseph Berke, the play follows her years as a resident of Kingsley Hall, where the innovative treatment approach begins her path to recovery. The play premiered at the Birmingham Rep in 1978, with Patti Love in the title role, Simon Callow as Berke, plus Timothy Spall and Roger Allam in the cast. It was broadcast in a radio adaptation as The Monday Play on BBC Radio on 26 June 1995.
- R. D. Laing’s Glasgow (1979). An episode of the Canadian TV series Cities.
- Did You Used to be R. D. Laing? (1989). Documentary portrait of Laing by Kirk Tougas and Tom Shandel.
- Eros, Love & Lies (1990). Documentary on Laing.
- What You See Is Where You’re At (2001). A collage of found footage by Luke Fowler on Laing's experiment in alternative therapy at Kingsley Hall.
- The Trap, part 1 (2007). Covering Laings' modeling of familial interactions using game theory.
- All Divided Selves (2011). Another collage of archive material and new footage by Luke Fowler.
- The Divided Laing or The Two Ronnies by Patrick Marmion was performed between 17 November and 12 December 2015 at the Arcola Theatre, Dalston London. This riotous play by Patrick Marmion, starring Alan Cox, captured the conflicts and tension between Aaron Esterson, David Cooper, Joe Berke, Mary Barnes, and Laing during the early Kingsley Hall days in the mid-1960s.
- Mad to Be Normal (2017). A fictionalised account of the Kingsley Hall project, starring David Tennant as Laing and directed by Robert Mullan.
- BBC Radio 4: Unforgettable – R. D. Laing & Adrian Laing (2018).
- Divided by Ian Pattison is a powerful play by Ian Pattison which sheds a sharp light on the events surrounding the death of Laing's second daughter, Susie, in 1976. The play was first staged at the Oran Mor in Glasgow's West End in 2013 and more recently from 14 October to 19 October 2019. Billy Mack played Laing.

== Selected bibliography ==
=== Laing's publications ===
- Laing, R. D. (1960). The Divided Self: An Existential Study in Sanity and Madness. London: Tavistock Publications, 1959; republished with a new preface, Harmondsworth: Penguin Books, 1965.
- Laing, R. D. (1961). The Self and Others. London: Tavistock Publications.
- Laing, R. D. and Esterson, A. (1964). Sanity, Madness and the Family. London: Penguin Books.
- Laing, R. D. and Cooper, D.G. (1964). Reason and Violence: A Decade of Sartre's Philosophy. (2nd ed.) London: Tavistock Publications Ltd.
- Laing, R. D., Phillipson, H. and Lee, A.R. (1966). Interpersonal Perception: A Theory and a Method of Research. London: Tavistock Publications.
- Laing, R. D. (1967). The Politics of Experience and The Bird of Paradise. Harmondsworth: Penguin.
- Laing, R. D. (1970). Knots. London: Penguin. Excerpt; Knots at IMDb.
- Laing, R. D. (1971). The Politics of the Family and Other Essays. London: Tavistock Publications.
- Laing, R. D. (1972). Knots. New York: Vintage Press.
- Laing, R. D. (1976). Do You Love Me? An Entertainment in Conversation and Verse. New York: Pantheon Books.
- Laing, R. D. (1976). Sonnets. London: Michael Joseph.
- Laing, R. D. (1976). The Facts of Life. London: Penguin.
- Laing, R. D. (1977). Conversations with Adam and Natasha. New York: Pantheon.
- Laing, R. D. (1982). The Voice of Experience: Experience, Science and Psychiatry. Harmondsworth: Penguin.
- Laing, R. D. (1985). Wisdom, Madness and Folly: The Making of a Psychiatrist 1927–1957. London: Macmillan.

=== On Laing by others ===
- R. D. Laing: A Life, HarperCollins 1997. The most authoritative biography of Laing written by his second son, Adrian Laing.
- Caretti, V. and R. D. Laing (2022). Dialogues on Madness and Wisdom: In Conservation with R. D. Laing. Edited by Groth, M. and D. Serra. London: The Society for Existential Analysis.
- Mott, F. J. and R. D. Laing (2014). Mythology of the Prenatal Life. London: Starwalker Press. (Hand-written annotations [c. 1977] by R. D. Laing are included in the text, revealing Laing's own thoughts and associative material on prenatal psychology as he studied this book.
- Mullan, B. (1995). Mad to be Normal: Conversations with R. D. Laing. London: Free Association Books.
- Russell, R.; Laing, R. D. (1992). R. D. Laing and Me: Lessons in Love (free download). New York: Hillgarth Press.

== See also ==
- Alice Miller – psychologist who was similar in influence to Laing
- David Smail – more modern writer with similarly unconventional views
- Dream speech – Emil Kraepelin's enigmatic dream speech, analogous to psychotic speech
- Emmy van Deurzen – existential therapist and psychologist who worked with Laing
- Eugène Minkowski – psychiatrist commended by Laing
- Existential therapy – form of psychotherapy focused on the client's lived experience of their subjective reality
- Family nexus – term coined by Laing
- Joseph Berke – psychoanalyst and therapist to Mary Barnes
- Martti Olavi Siirala – psychiatrist, psychoanalyst, and philosopher similar to Laing
- Stephen Ticktin – psychiatrist, therapist, lecturer, and prominent figure in the anti-psychiatry movement
- The Trap – three-part BBC series that in its first episode concentrates on Laing's work
