= David Cooper (psychiatrist) =

South African-born psychiatrist (1931–1986)

- Cooper in 1977
- Born: David Graham Cooper; 1931; Cape Town, Union of South Africa
- Died: 29 July 1986 (aged 54–55); Paris, France
- Known for: Anti-psychiatry
- Scientific career
- Fields: Psychiatry

David Graham Cooper (1931 – 29 July 1986) was a South African-born psychiatrist and theorist who was prominent in the anti-psychiatry movement. Cooper graduated from the University of Cape Town in 1955. R. D. Laing claimed that Cooper underwent Soviet training to prepare him as an anti-apartheid communist revolutionary. After completing his course, he never returned to South Africa out of fear that the Bureau of State Security would eliminate him. He moved to London, where he worked at several hospitals. From 1961 to 1965, he ran an experimental unit for young people with schizophrenia called Villa 21, which he saw as a revolutionary 'anti-hospital' and a prototype for the later Kingsley Hall Community.

In 1965, Cooper was involved with Laing and others in establishing the Philadelphia Association. An "existential Marxist", he left the Philadelphia Association in the 1970s in a disagreement over its lack of political orientation. Cooper coined the term "anti-psychiatry" in 1967, and wrote the book Psychiatry and Anti-psychiatry in 1971. He also co-founded the Antiuniversity of London in February 1968.

== Leading concepts ==
Cooper believed that madness and psychosis are the manifestation of a disparity between one's own 'true' identity and our social identity (the identity others give us and we internalise). Cooper's ultimate solution was through revolution. To this end, Cooper travelled to Argentina as he felt the country was rife with revolutionary potential. He later returned to England before moving to France where he spent the last years of his life.

Cooper coined the term anti-psychiatry to describe opposition and opposing methods to the orthodox psychiatry of the time. He coordinated the Congress on the Dialectics of Liberation, held in London at The Roundhouse in Chalk Farm from 15 July to 30 July 1967. Participants included R. D. Laing, Paul Goodman, Allen Ginsberg, Herbert Marcuse and the Black Panthers' Stokely Carmichael. Jean-Paul Sartre was scheduled to appear but cancelled at the last moment. The term "anti-psychiatry" was first used by David Cooper in 1967. He was a founding member of the Philadelphia Association, London.

== Family and The Death of the Family ==
Cooper describes how "during the end of the writing of this book against the family, I went through a profound spiritual and bodily crisis. ...The people who sat with me and tended to me with immense kindliness and concern during the worst of this crisis were my brother Peter and sister-in-law Carol ... a true family." He had earlier described the need to break free from "one's whole family past ... in a way that is more personally effective than a simple aggressive rupture or crude acts of geographical separation", as well as the kind of false autonomy which occurs when "people are still very much in the net of the internal family (and often the external family too) and compulsively search for rather less restricting replica family systems". The book may thus be seen as a self-reflexive attempt "to illustrate the power of the internal family, the family that one can separate from over thousands of miles and yet still remain in its clutches and be strangled by those clutches".

== The Language of Madness ==
In 1967, Cooper provided an introduction to Michel Foucault's Madness and Civilization, which began "Madness has in our age become some sort of lost truth", a statement not atypical of "a time which posterity now readily regards as half-crazed". Continuing the same line of thought, by the end of the following decade, "he elevated madness to the status of a liberatory force", in his last publication. Here are a few typical utterances from The Language of Madness (Cooper 1980): "Madness is permanent revolution in the life of a person ... a deconstitution of oneself with the implicit promise of return to a more fully realized world"'.

== Major works ==
- Reason and Violence: a decade of Sartre's philosophy, Tavistock (1964) – co-authored with R. D. Laing
- Psychiatry and Anti-Psychiatry (Ed.), Paladin (1967)
- The Dialectics of Liberation (Ed.), Penguin (1968) – Cooper's introduction can be read at the Herbert Marcuse website.
- The Death of the Family, Penguin (1971)
- Grammar of Living, Penguin (1974)
- Qui Sont les Dissidents, Galilee (1977)
- The Language of Madness, Penguin (1978)

== See also ==
- Stephen Ticktin
- Socialist Patients' Collective
