= Philadelphia Association =

The Philadelphia Association is a UK charity concerned with the understanding and relief of mental suffering. It was founded in 1965 by the radical psychiatrist and psychoanalyst R. D. Laing along with fellow psychiatrists David Cooper, Joseph Berke, Aaron Esterson, writer Clancy Sigal as well as John Heaton, Joan Cunnold and Sid Briskin.

Kingsley Hall, the first of a number of community houses, was founded in 1965 (a building dating from 1928).

The Philadelphia Association (PA) came into being to challenge and to widen the discourse around the teaching and practise of psychotherapy and continues to offer a training, an affordable therapy service and two community houses for those seeking retreat.
