= Kingsley Hall =

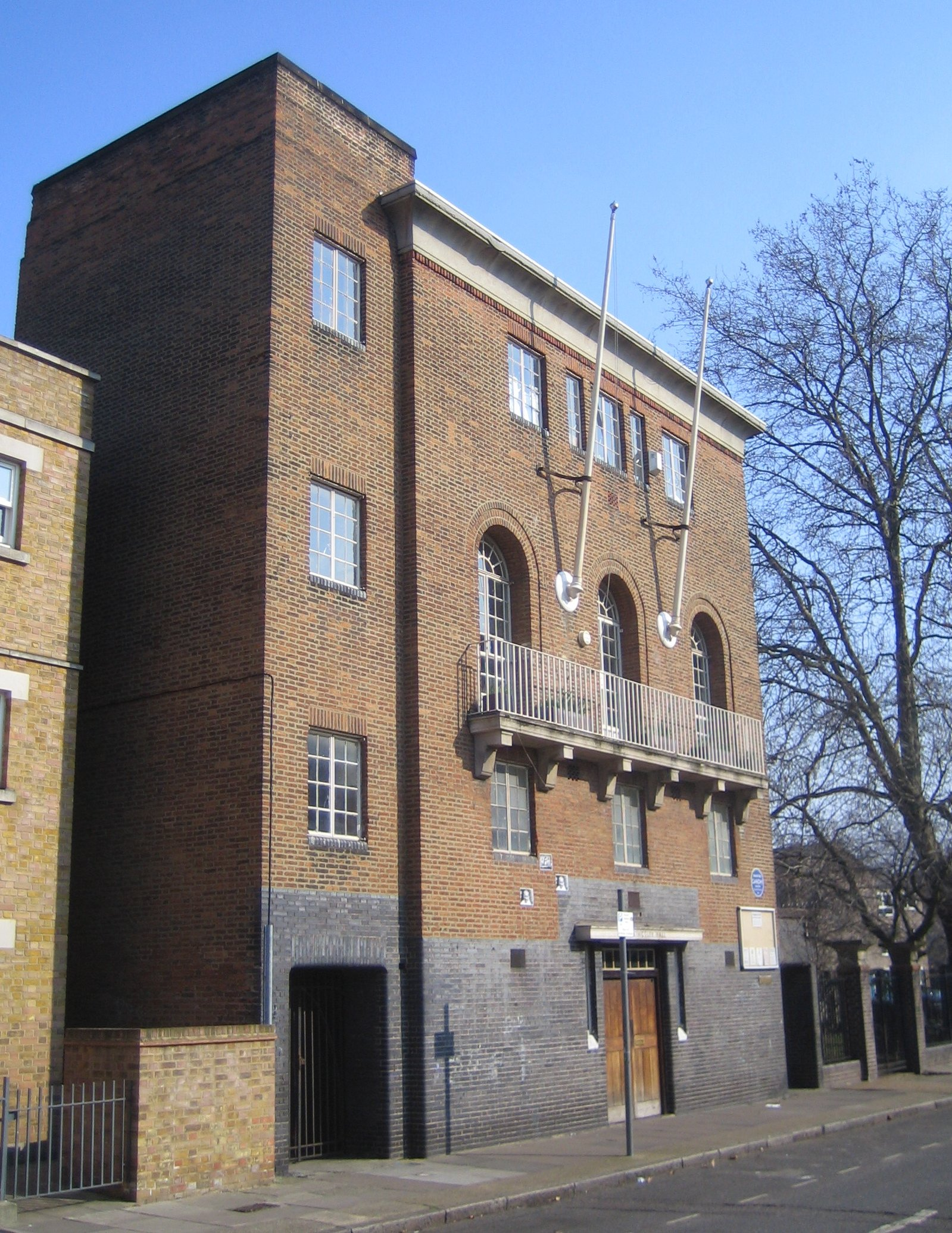
- Kingsley Hall (front view) in Bromley-by-Bow, also home of the Gandhi Foundation
- Interactive map of Kingsley Hall
- Location: Powis Road, Bromley-by-Bow, London, England

History
- Built: 1928

Site notes
- Area: London Borough of Tower Hamlets
- Architect: Charles Cowles-Voysey
- Architectural style: Neo-Georgian style
- Governing body: Charitable Trust

Listed Building – Grade II
- Designated: September 1973
- Reference no.: 1357884

Kingsley Hall is a community centre, in Powis Road, Bromley-by-Bow in the London Borough of Tower Hamlets. It dates back to the work of Doris and Muriel Lester, who had a nursery school in nearby Bruce Road. Their brother, Kingsley Lester, died aged 26 in 1914, leaving money for work in the local area for "educational, social and recreational" purposes, with which the Lesters bought and converted a disused chapel. The current Hall was built with a stone-laying ceremony taking place on 14 July 1927.

A second community centre, also known as Kingsley Hall with a church (KHCCC - Kingsley Hall Church and Community Centre), was later built by the sisters in the neighbouring London Borough of Barking and Dagenham on Parsloes Avenue in Dagenham. KHCCC underwent redevelopment in 2018.

During the General Strike of 1926, Kingsley Hall in Bow became a shelter and soup kitchen for workers. Mohandas Gandhi stayed in Kingsley Hall in 1931 and the building now houses the Gandhi Foundation. The room where he stayed has been preserved. In 1935, hunger marchers on the Jarrow March stayed at the Hall.

In 1965 R. D. Laing and his associates asked the Lesters for permission to use the Hall as an alternative community, influenced by the World War II Northfield experiments, for treating people affected by mental health crisis. Kingsley Hall became home to one of the most radical experiments in psychology of the time. The aim of the experiment by the Philadelphia Association was to create a model for non-restraining, non-drug therapies for those people seriously affected by schizophrenia. The idea of starting this type of community was an initiative suggested by Mary Barnes an artist and former nurse and, first resident as patient.

The hall was designated a Grade II listed building in September 1973.

== Origins ==
Doris, Muriel and Kingsley Lester grew up in wealth and comfort, though there was a family connection to the poor East End districts. Their grandfather Henry Lester grew up in poverty, starting work as a bricklayer's labourer at the age of eight. Their father, also called Henry Lester started work at the Thames Ironworks at Blackwall and Canning Town at the age of ten. He latterly owned a ship repair yard in Blackwall and would help finance some of his children's early social work. Both father and grandfather were devout Baptists.

Henry Lester bought a cottage in Loughton, (then a countryside district of Essex), to be used as a holiday place by families from Bow. Named after his deceased wife, Rachel Cottage also served to provide holidays for nursery children.

In 1912, Doris and Muriel Lester started a Nursery School at numbers 58 and 60 Bruce Road. Children were fed, clothed and cared for at a charge of one shilling (five pence a day). When mothers could not afford fees, children were sponsored by a network of wealthier supporters. The service was soon expanded to include activities for older groups with the aim to provide for the development of the whole person – the mind, body and spirit – in an environment which brought people together regardless of class, race and religion.

Kingsley Lester died in 1914, leaving what money he had for work in Bow towards "educational, social and recreational" purposes. Doris and Muriel Lester bought an old chapel on the corner of Eagling Road in 1915, which was then re-decorated and fitted out by local volunteers. It was a "people's house", where friends and neighbours, workmen, factory girls and children of Bow came together for "worship, study, fun and friendship". The premises became known as Kingsley Hall, and operated a Nursery, as well as social events, concerts and adult school. Football, Sunday services and summer holiday schemes were also begun.

The aims of the centre were expressed on the membership cards as "a place of fellowship in which people can meet for social, educational and recreational intercourse without barriers of class, colour or creed."

During World War I, in the face of criticism, Doris and Muriel remained pacifists. Kingsley Hall ran a soup kitchen and stayed open at night for Air Raid Wardens. At the end of the war, Doris and Muriel joined a march to the House of Commons demanding that milk be sent to Germany, where people were starving. A German child was adopted by the members of Kingsley Hall who paid for her to stay with a local family for two years.

After the War, Kingsley Hall maintained strong links with the Suffragettes in east London. Activists campaigned for votes for women in the face of threats. Muriel Lester spoke on street corners and on Sunday mornings in Victoria Park. After her talks, local people contributed towards maintaining services at Kingsley Hall. Muriel became an Alderman on the Metropolitan Borough of Poplar and fought for basic provisions such as milk for children under five.

Enough money was saved to build the Children's House on Bruce Road which was opened by H. G. Wells in 1923. The foundation stones represent: Vision, Nature, Rhythm and Music; Beauty, Health, Education, Motherhood, Internationalism and Fellowship. The Children's House continues to be run as a Nursery School.

== Powis Road site ==
During the 1926 General Strike, the hall became a shelter and soup kitchen for workers. Larger accommodation was needed as the popularity of Kingsley Hall grew, and a new Kingsley Hall was built on Powis Road, with funds from people in the neighbourhood and donations from wealthy patrons. The architect was Charles Cowles-Voysey.

A stone-laying ceremony took place on 14 July 1927. The following people laid stones representing different aspects.

- Sir Walford Davies laid the brick of MUSIC
- Mr J.A.R. Cairns laid the brick of CITIZENSHIP
- Miss Sybil Thorndike laid the brick of DRAMA
- Miss De Natorp laid the brick of EDUCATION
- Mrs D.S. Waterlow laid the brick of OPEN AIR and COUNTRY
- Mr C. Cowles-Voysey laid the brick of ARCHITECTURE
- Mr P.R. LeMare laid the brick of COMMERCE
- Dr Maxwell Garnett laid the brick of WORLD BROTHERHOOD
- Miss Mary Arden Shakespeare laid the brick of FRIENDSHIP
- Mr John Galsworthy laid the brick of LITERATURE
- Mrs J. Douglas Watson laid the brick of the KINGDOM OF HEAVEN
- Margaret Martin laid the brick of KINGSLEY HALL CLUB
- George Lansbury laid the brick of SUNDAY EVENING SERVICE
- Mrs Harvey laid the brick of the WOMEN'S CLUB
- Tom McCarthy laid the brick of the WAYFARERS
- Mayor T.J.Goodway laid the brick of the BOROUGH
- Lady Clare Annesley laid the brick of SERVICE
- George M. Ll. Davies MP laid the brick of POLITICS
- Gilbert Bayes laid the brick of ART

Kingsley Hall (on Powis Road) was opened on 15 September 1928. The building included residential units or cells, and also had a clubroom and dining room, kitchen, office and a space for worship.

== Gandhi ==
In 1931 Mahatma Gandhi accepted an invitation to stay there while he took part in talks on the future of India. He stayed in a small cell-bedroom on the roof, sleeping on the roof itself when the weather was suitable.

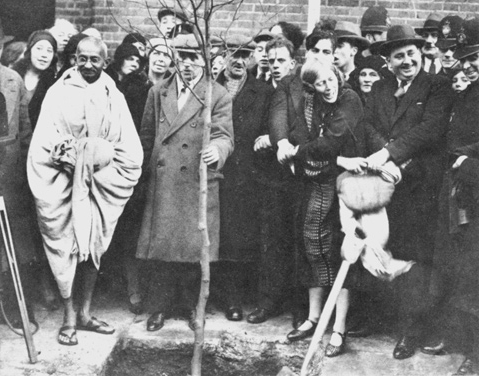
Gandhi planting a tree outside Kingsley Hall on 3 December 1931. The tree was destroyed in World War II by a flash and was replanted by Lady Attenborough in 1984.

In 1931, Lylie Valentine was a participant in activities at the hall before she became a worker at the nursery. In her pamphlet: Two Sisters and the Cockney Kids, she recounts the excitement surrounding Gandhi's stay in the East End:

The same year (1931), Muriel told us that Mahatma Gandhi (at whose ashram she had stayed in India) was coming over for the Round Table Conference. He had refused to stay at a hotel, but would come if he could live with the working class, so he was to stay at Kingsley Hall....when he arrived, I think all the people in East London waited outside to see him. ...besides doing his work with the Government, he spent a lot of time with us. He visited the Nursery School and all the children called him Uncle Gandhi. At six o'clock each morning, after his prayers, he took his walk along the canal, talking to workmen on the way.... There was something about him that always lives with the people.

His daily walk would start before dawn and typically take about an hour at a brisk pace, taking in much of the local area, especially along the Lea and the local canal network. Routes varied, but he particularly enjoyed the walk along the Sewerbank (now known as the Greenway) through Stratford to Plaistow, because of the elevated views it gave. On these walks he would be joined by crowds of well-wishers eager to speak to him on a very wide range subjects, and this included many children. On occasion he would visit the homes of local people. He found it easy to relate to the local people, with Muriel Lester observing

He always enjoyed the swift repartee of Cockney wit. He was never at a loss for a reply in the same vein.

Gandhi lived at Kingsley Hall for 12 weeks, and also visited Kingsley Hall's Dagenham site in that time. Stories that he was accompanied by a goat were pure press invention. Among Gandhi's visitors were Charlie Chaplin, George Bernard Shaw, the Pearly King and Queen of east London, many politicians including David Lloyd George and the Archbishop of Canterbury Cosmo Gordon Lang.

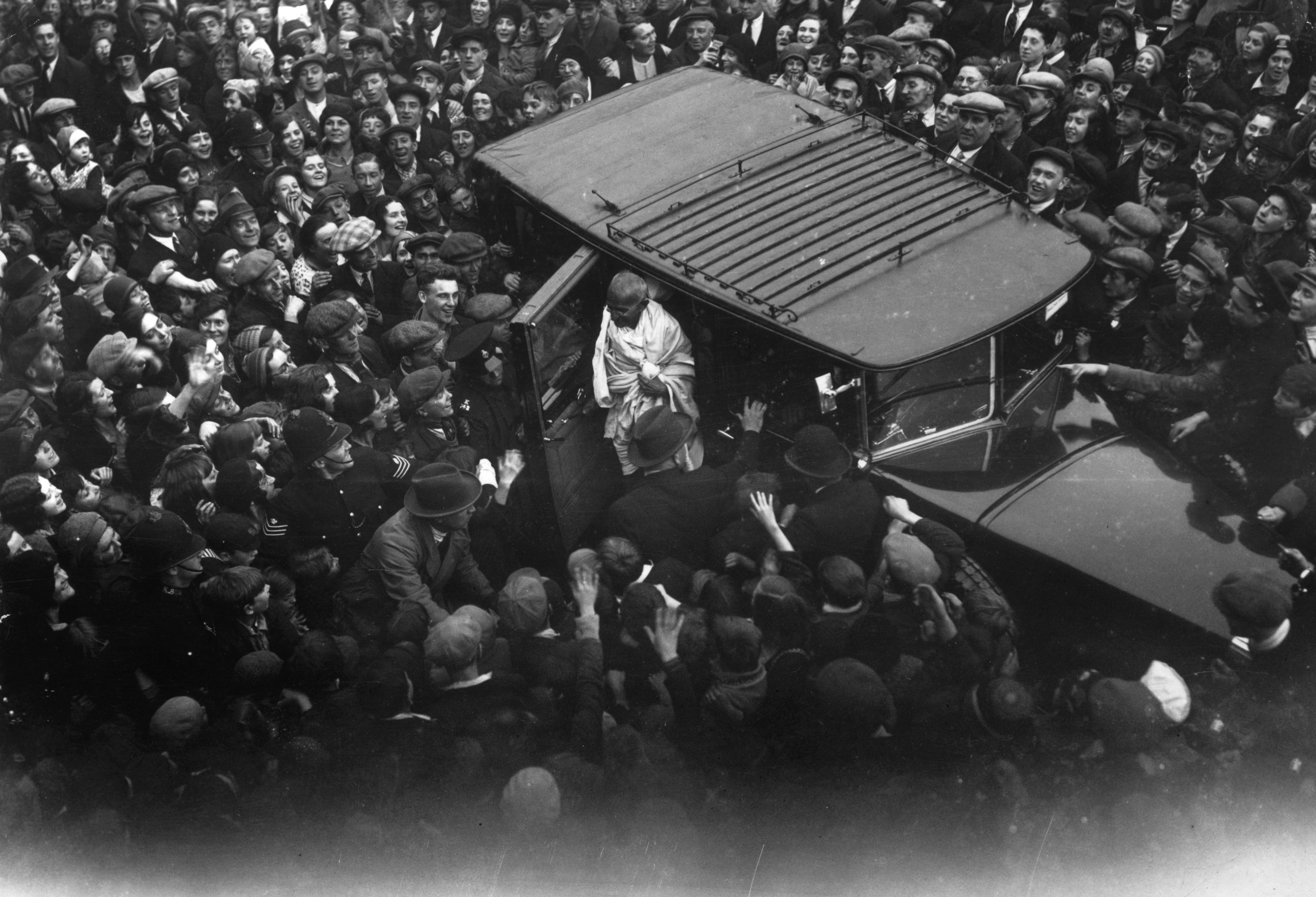
Gandhi's welcome to Canning Town.

Gandhi loved East London and the East Enders reciprocated. On leaving Kingsley Hall, he wrote in its visitor book: Love surrounded me here

Muriel Lester later accompanied Mahatma Gandhi on his tour of earthquake-shaken regions in Bihar on his anti-untouchability tour during 1934.

In 1954 English Heritage erected a Blue plaque on the façade of the building in honour of Gandhi.

== Jarrow March ==
In 1935 Ellen Wilkinson led the Jarrow March to London, and some of the men were put up at Kingsley Hall. It was the poor helping the poor. They collected their pennies and opened the jumble store for them. Muriel Lester visited the Far East, USA, China, Japan and India to report to the League of Nations on drug investigations in the regions. Muriel Lester retired from full-time work in 1958 and in 1963 she became a Freeman of the Borough of Poplar on her eightieth birthday. Muriel Lester died in 1967.

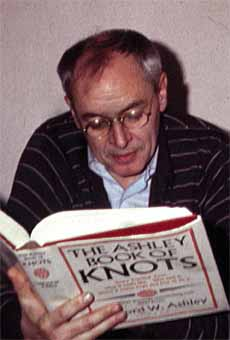
R. D. Laing in 1983

== R. D. Laing and Kingsley Hall ==
Following World War II, with the welfare state having undertaken much of the work advocated by the Lester sisters, Kingsley Hall continued on a quieter note as a youth hostel and community activity centre.

In 1965 R. D. Laing and his colleagues asked the Lesters for use of the Hall as a community for themselves and people in a state of psychosis. As a result, Kingsley Hall became home to the Philadelphia Association and one of the most radical experiments in psychiatry. Based on the notion that psychosis, a state of reality akin to living in a waking dream, is not an illness simply to be eliminated through the electric shocks favoured in the Western tradition of the time but, as in other cultures, a state of trance which could even be valued as mystical or Shamanistic, it sought to allow schizophrenic people the space to explore their madness and internal chaos. Residents (in the grip of psychosis) were often treated with kindness and respect with sincere efforts to alleviate their suffering.

One notable resident of this experiment was Mary Barnes. Along with resident psychiatrist Joseph Berke, Mary later went on to write Two Accounts of a Journey Through Madness, describing her stay at Kingsley Hall and use of her mental condition as a vehicle for painting and creative expression. Her account became famous in the 1970s when it was used as the basis for the play Mary Barnes by David Edgar. Another notable resident was the renowned Norwegian author Axel Jensen.

The activities of residents in the "no-holds barred" experiment made the local community largely hostile to the project, and there were regular reports of harassment. After five years (from 1965 to 1970) the project was wound up and Kingsley Hall was boarded up. It came to an end when two people jumped off the roof. During the seventies the building was severely damaged.

== Recent history ==
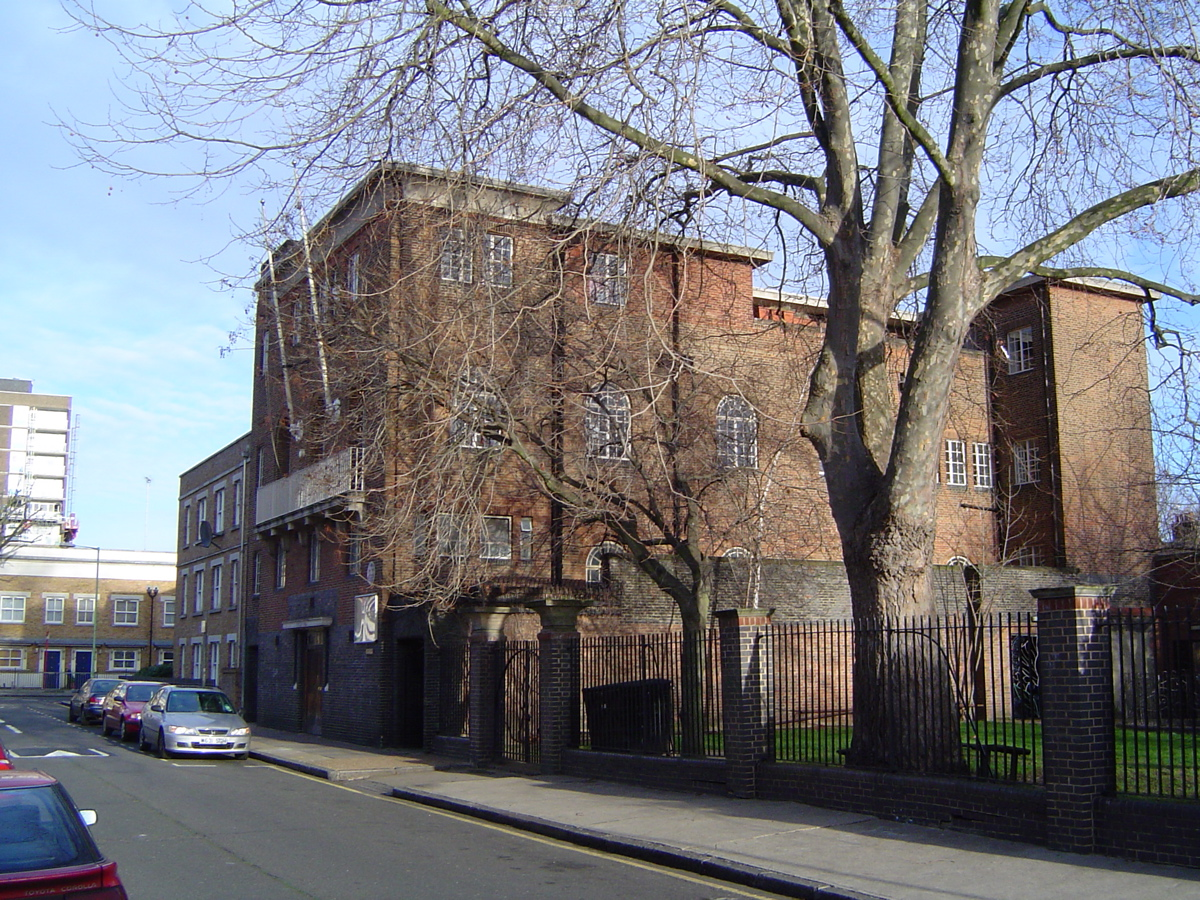
Kingsley Hall

In the 1980s Kingsley Hall was one of the sets used in the film Gandhi. During the filming Richard Attenborough united with the Kingsley Hall Action Group to raise enough funds to carry out an extensive refurbishing. Many of the local community contributed their skills and commitment to bring Kingsley Hall back into a usable community centre.

Kingsley Hall was reopened 2 March 1985 with events in the week preceding, and has since gone on to be used for activities ranging from youth groups, holiday outings or arts and photography workshops, for advice surgeries, wedding functions and educational projects. It also houses the office of the Gandhi Foundation, which pursues interests of peace internationally, in the tradition of its namesake.

In 1995, The Hall suffered two major burglaries when vandals broke in and burnt down the offices. The committed staff and volunteers were devastated by this destruction, but continued to run youth groups, advice sessions, clubs and meetings. The management interpreted its remit as serving the local community and the cause of international peace and to do so in innovatory ways.

The Hall is run by a trust and is a registered charity no. 263813. Its premises are normally available for use by community and other social groups. In 2009, Kingsley Hall launched its website

The Bishopsgate Institute in London houses the Muriel Lester Archive
