= Donald Doyle =

Donald Doyle may refer to:

- Donald D. Doyle (1915–2011), American politician from California
- Don H. Doyle, American historian
- Donald V. Doyle (1925–2007), American politician from Iowa
