= Bruce Levine =

Bruce Levine may refer to:

- Bruce E. Levine, American psychologist
- Bruce N. Levine (born 1955), American racehorse trainer
