= 55 Steps =

2017 film

- German theatrical release poster
- Directed by: Bille August
- Written by: Mark Bruce Rosin
- Produced by: Sara Risher; Mark Bruce Rosin
- Starring: Helena Bonham Carter; Hilary Swank; Jeffrey Tambor
- Cinematography: Filip Zumbrunn
- Edited by: Hansjörg Weißbrich
- Music by: Annette Focks
- Production companies: Elsani Film; Potemkino; MMC Studios
- Distributed by: Warner Bros. Pictures (Germany)
- Release dates: 7 September 2017 (TIFF); 3 May 2018 (Germany)
- Running time: 115 minutes
- Countries: Germany; Belgium
- Language: English

55 Steps is a 2017 German-Belgian drama film directed by Bille August and starring Helena Bonham Carter, Hilary Swank, and Jeffrey Tambor. The film is based on the true story of Eleanor Riese.

== Premise ==
The story is about a woman committed to a mental health facility. Prior to 1987, it was assumed that the Lanterman–Petris–Short Act allowed involuntary treatment for those who were detained under an initial three-day hold (for evaluation and treatment) and a subsequent fourteen-day hospitalization (for those patients declared after the three-day hold to be dangerous to themselves or others or gravely disabled). In 1987, in Riese v. St. Mary's Hospital and Medical Center, the California State Court of Appeals declared that these patients had the right to exercise informed consent regarding the use of antipsychotic drugs, except in an emergency, and if they rejected medication "a judicial determination of their incapacity to make treatment decisions" was required before they could be involuntarily treated. This case was a class action suit brought in the name of patient Eleanor Riese by the California ACLU.

== Cast ==
- Helena Bonham Carter as Eleanor Riese
- Hilary Swank as Colette Hughes
- Jeffrey Tambor as Mort Cohen
- Tim Plester as Robbie
- Michael Culkin as Judge Farelly
- Jonathan Kerrigan as Dr. Bardy

== Release ==
The film had its world premiere in the Gala Presentations section at the 2017 Toronto International Film Festival. Its theatrical release began in Germany on 3 May 2018. 55 Steps is the international title, the movie is known as 'Eleanor & Colette' in some markets.

== Reception ==
=== Critical response ===
On review aggregator Rotten Tomatoes, the film holds an approval rating of 50% based on 8 reviews, with an average rating of 6.83/10. On Metacritic, the film has a weighted average score of 42 out of 100, based on 4 critics, indicating "mixed or average reviews".
