= Mental illness denial =

Opposition to psychiatric diagnoses

Mental illness denial or mental disorder denial is a form of denialism in which a person or group denies the existence of mental disorders. Both serious analysts and pseudoscientific movements may question the existence of certain disorders.

A minority of professional researchers see disorders such as depression from a sociocultural perspective and argue that solutions should be sought through fixing a dysfunction in the society, not in the sufferer's brain.

== Insight ==
In psychiatry, insight is the ability of an individual to understand their mental health, and anosognosia is a condition caused by brain damage where the person becomes cognitively unaware, whether partially or completely, of their impairment.

Certain psychological analysts argue this denialism is a coping mechanism usually fueled by narcissistic injury. According to Elyn Saks, probing patient's denial may lead to better ways to help them overcome their denial and provide insight into other issues. Major reasons for denial are narcissistic injury and denialism. In denialism, a person tries to deny psychologically uncomfortable truth and tries to rationalize it. This urge for denialism is fueled further by narcissistic injury. Narcissism gets injured when a person feels vulnerable (or weak or overwhelmed) for some reason like mental illness.

== Scholarly criticism of psychiatric diagnosis ==
A small minority of scholars have criticized mental health diagnoses as arbitrary. According to Thomas Szasz, mental illness is a social construct. He views psychiatry as a social control and mechanism for political oppression. Szasz wrote a book on the subject in 1961, The Myth of Mental Illness.

== Religion ==
Conservative Christians, including charismatics, are more likely to attribute the cause of mental illness to spiritual factors instead of seeking help from psychiatrists. It is often believed that faith is the most effective treatment option. This kind of teaching is associated with the idea that mental illness does not exist, and that Christians are immune to mental illness.

== See also ==
- Anti-intellectualism
- Neurodiversity
