= Alan Short =

American politician

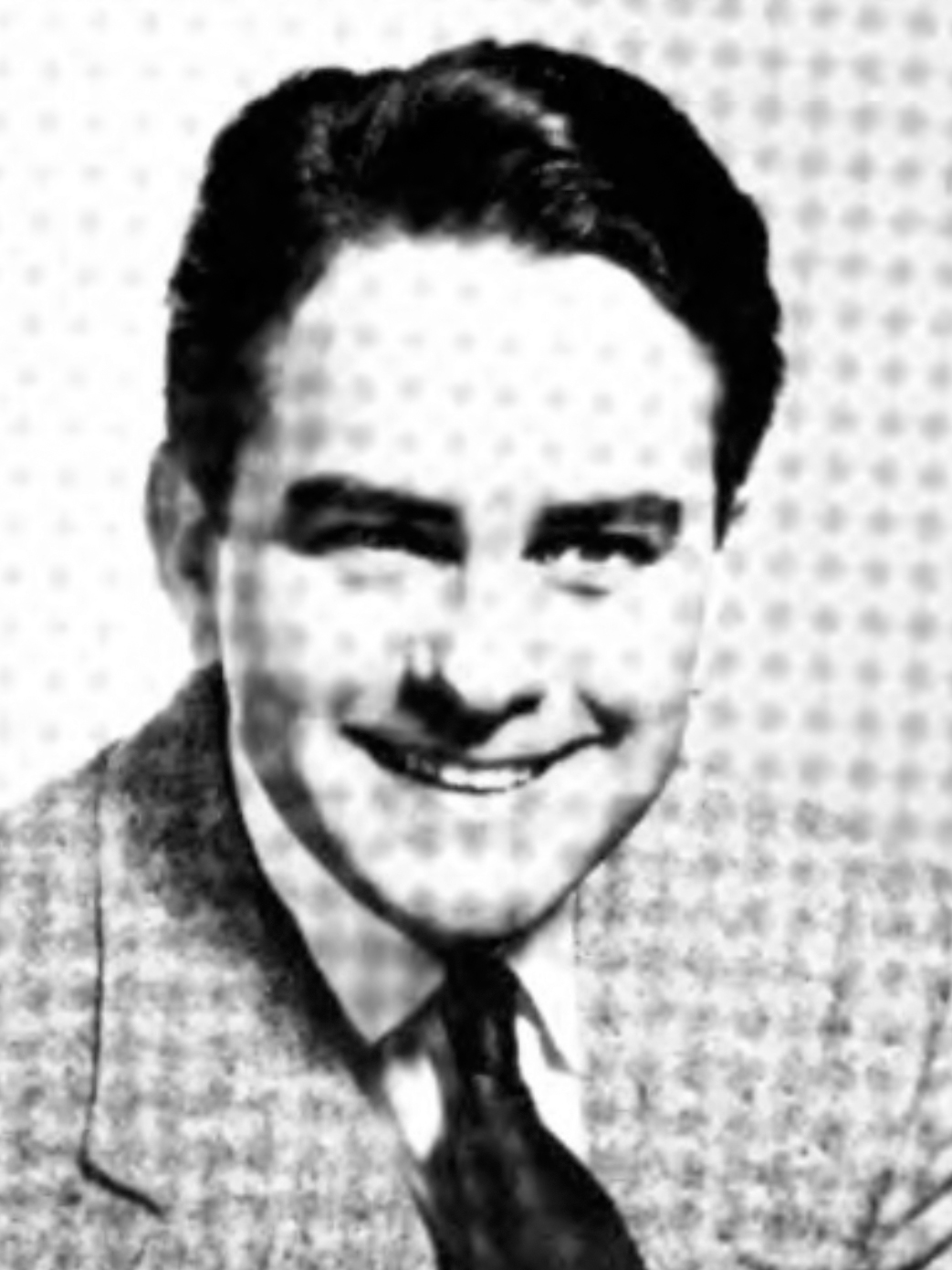

Member of the California Senate from the 6th district
- In office January 2, 1967 - December 2, 1974
- Preceded by: Stan Pittman
- Succeeded by: George Moscone

Member of the California Senate from the 20th district
- In office January 3, 1955 - January 2, 1967
- Preceded by: Verne W. Hoffman
- Succeeded by: William E. Coombs

Personal details
- Born: February 22, 1920 San Francisco, California, U.S.
- Died: March 6, 2004 (aged 84) Sacramento, California, U.S.
- Party: Democratic
- Spouse: Sylvia Lucille Stevens
- Children: 1
- Education: College of the Pacific; Hastings College of Law

Military service
- Branch/service: United States Navy
- Battles/wars: World War II

Alan Short (February 22, 1920 – March 6, 2004) was an American politician. As a third-generation Californian, he served in the U.S. Navy in World War II. He attended local schools in Stockton, California and College of the Pacific and was a graduate of Hastings College of Law. He became Deputy District Attorney of San Joaquin County. Short was elected as a Democrat to the California State Senate in 1954, representing Sacramento and San Joaquin Counties, and served for 20 years.

He is recognized nationally in the United States for his Community Mental Health Service Act (Short-Doyle Act) of 1957, co-authored with Assemblyman Donald D. Doyle (February 6, 1915 – January 31, 2011) and signed into law by Governor Goodwin Knight, and is well known for his legislation in the field of mental health and developmental disabilities. Short retired from the State Senate in 1974.

Senator Short served as chairman of the California Senate Select Committee on Laws Relating to Alcoholic Beverages from 1972 to 1974.

He was married to Mary Short, an accomplished photographer, who founded the Alan Short Center (ASC) in Stockton in 1976.

== See also ==
- Lanterman–Petris–Short Act
