= Lanterman–Petris–Short Act =

California law concerning involuntary psychiatric commitment

California State Legislature
- Full name: Lanterman–Petris–Short Act
- Introduced: 1967
- Sponsor(s): Frank Lanterman, Nicholas Petris, Alan Short
- Governor: Ronald Reagan
- Code: California Welfare & Institutions Code
- Section: 5000 et seq.

Status: Current legislation

The Lanterman–Petris–Short (LPS) Act (Chapter 1667 of the 1967 California Statutes, codified as Cal. Welf & Inst. Code, sec. 5000 et seq.) regulates involuntary civil commitment to a mental health institution in the state of California. It has been described as a "landmark" act which established the precedent for modern mental health commitment procedures in the United States. The bipartisan bill was co-authored by California State Assemblyman Frank D. Lanterman (R) and California State Senators Nicholas C. Petris (D) and Alan Short (D), and signed into law in 1967 by Governor Ronald Reagan. The Act went into full effect on July 1, 1972. It cited seven articles of intent:

1. To end the inappropriate, indefinite, and involuntary commitment of mentally disordered persons, people with developmental disabilities, and persons impaired by chronic alcoholism, and to eliminate legal disabilities;
2. To provide prompt evaluation and treatment of persons with serious mental disorders or impaired by chronic alcoholism;
3. To guarantee and protect public safety;
4. To safeguard individual rights through judicial review;
5. To provide individualized treatment, supervision, and placement services by a conservatorship program for gravely disabled persons;
6. To encourage the full use of all existing agencies, professional personnel and public funds to accomplish these objectives and to prevent duplication of services and unnecessary expenditures;
7. To protect mentally disordered persons and developmentally disabled persons from criminal acts.

The Act in effect ended all hospital commitments by the judiciary system, except in the case of criminal sentencing, e.g., convicted sexual offenders, and those who were "gravely disabled", defined as unable to obtain food, clothing, or housing. It did not, however, impede the right of voluntary commitments. It expanded the evaluative reach of psychiatrists and created provisions and criteria for holds.

Prior to 1987 it was assumed that the Act allowed involuntary treatment for those who were detained under an initial three-day hold (for evaluation and treatment) and a subsequent fourteen-day hospitalization (for those people declared after the three-day hold to be dangerous to themselves or others or gravely disabled). However, in the 1987 case of Riese v. St. Mary’s Hospital and Medical Center, the California Court of Appeal declared that these people had the right to exercise informed consent regarding the use of antipsychotic drugs, except in an emergency, and if they rejected medication "a judicial determination of their incapacity to make treatment decisions" was required before they could be involuntarily treated. This case was a class action suit brought in the name of person Eleanor Riese by the California ACLU. Eleanor Riese's story is depicted in the movie 55 Steps.

== LPS evaluation, detention, and conservatorship process ==
Under the LPS Act, individuals can be detained into a locked psychiatric facility in the following process:

=== 5150 hold ===
Under California Welfare and Institutions Code (WIC) 5150, an individual can be involuntarily placed in a locked psychiatric facility for an evaluation for up to 72 hours. Any peace officer or specific individuals authorized by a county government may place the hold. Three criteria apply – the individual is assessed to be a danger to themselves, a danger to others, or "gravely disabled". Per WIC 5008, grave disability is defined as an individual's lack of ability, due to their mental illness, to provide for their food, clothing, or shelter. In the case of children, it is the inability to use food, clothing, or shelter even if it is supplied.

It is not uncommon for police to be the party who places them on the 5150 hold and then takes the individual to the hospital for further assessment. Over the next 72 hours, the hospital or psychiatrist must determine the individual's need for further locked psychiatric detainment. If the individual's condition clears up and they are no longer a danger to others or themselves or gravely disabled, they are released from the hospital. If, however, they remain a danger to others or themselves or continue to be gravely disabled, the hospital/psychiatrist may then request a 5250 hold to thereby keep the individual in the hospital beyond the 72-hour limit of the 5150 hold.

==== In popular culture ====
Largely because many American movies and television programs are primarily produced in California, usage of the term 5150 has spread beyond its original location and user population. An album of the same name by the California hard rock band Van Halen was named directly for the code section, and several derivative uses followed. MGK’s 2022 album Mainstream Sellout features a song named for the term.

=== 5250 hold ===
If, after a 72-hour hold, an individual is deemed to still be a danger to others or themselves, or is gravely disabled, WIC 5250 permits an individual to be involuntarily held (in a locked psychiatric hospital) for an additional 14 days.

Unlike a 5150 hold, a 5250 hold requires that the individual served receive a court hearing within 4 days of being served to ascertain the validity of the hold. Court hearings are often held in the hospital. Individuals are provided an attorney and a county court officer reviews the evidence for the hold presented by the hospital, hears the argument of the client and their attorney, and decides whether or not to uphold the 5250.

Just as with the 5150 hold, during the 5250 hold, the individual is continually being assessed by psychiatric staff. Again, if the individual is (at any time) deemed to be no longer a danger or gravely disabled, they are then released from the hospital.

According to section 5257 of the act, the individual must be released after 14 days, unless: they agree to further treatment on a voluntary basis, they are certified for an additional 14 days of intensive treatment, they are certified for an additional 30 days of intensive treatment, they are the subject of a conservatorship (commonly known as a Temporary LPS Conservatorship) petition, or they are the subject of a petition for post-certification treatment of a dangerous person.

=== 5350 hold (temporary LPS conservatorship) ===
A 5350 hold, otherwise known as a temporary LPS conservatorship (under W&I Code § 5352.1), is initiated at the end of a 14-day hold. Such is initiated by the individual's treating psychiatrist and co-signed by the medical director of the psychiatric facility to the Public Guardian Office in the individual's county of residence. The basis for the LPS temporary conservatorship is that the individual (due to their mental illness, even after ~17 days of involuntary psychiatric detention) remains "gravely disabled."

There are 58 counties in California, each with its own independent Public Guardian Office. Unlike other conservatorship processes in California (probate/older adult or limited/developmentally disabled) - a LPS conservatorship cannot be initiated by the public at large. Codified in the WIC - the individual must go through the 5150 - 5250 process and from there the county Public Guardian is the only authorized party to be able to request for a LPS conservatorship. The legislative intent for such was that prior to the LPS Act, it was felt individuals were often psychiatrically committed for subjective (if not outright punitive) reasons. To combat such potential abuses, the county Public Guardian, seen as an impartial third party, was designated as sole party.

Once the individual is on a LPS temporary conservatorship, they are no longer legally on a "hold," but now, legal consent to treat and continue to detain the individual (now known as the "conservatee") lies with the Public Guardian office.

A temporary LPS conservatorship can last a maximum of 180 days. As the county superior court has direct oversight of LPS conservatorship matters, typically the conservatee is afforded court hearings (for status) every 30 days. Unlike other conservatorship hearing, LPS conservatorship matters/records are not open to the public.

With 58 counties, the Public Guardian Offices and Superior Courts may interpret and practice differing methods of legal administration of LPS conservatorship. In general, all conservatees are appointed legal counsel (typically from the public defender's office), and during the course of their LPS conservatorship, they can ask for a series of writs and hearings or even a full jury trial to contest their detention and overall LPS conservatorship. It is not uncommon for a psychiatrist to conversely declare the conservatee is no longer gravely disabled. During the course of the LPS conservatorship, if the conservatee stabilizes and can thereby be discharged to the community, a psychiatrist can request that the LPS conservatorship be dismissed (for lack of legal support).

During a temporary LPS conservatorship, it is the general duty of the Public Guardian Office to ensure the conservatee is properly cared for and that the conservatee continues to require locked psychiatric care.

During the LPS temporary conservatorship, it is indeed the Public Guardian, not the conservatee, who consents to treatment and placement. A common way to understand this is to think of the relationship as that of a parent to a child - in that a minor child cannot consent to medical care. The same goes for the conservatee - in that the Public Guardian consents to his or her psychiatric treatment and placement.

If during the LPS temporary conservatorship, the Public Guardian feels the conservatee will (for the foreseeable future) need to remain in locked psychiatric care - the Public Guardian can then seek to have the LPS conservatorship changed from temporary to general (also referred to as "Permanent" but this can be a misnomer as it is neither permanent nor indefinite). With the appointment of a permanent LPS conservatorship (approved by the court) - the conservatee is now under the care / authority of the LPS conservator for exactly 1 year. It is with a permanent LPS conservatorship that then the public (family / friends) can now become involved. Upon request, pending court approval, family and/or friends (unlike the temporary LPS conservatorship) can be appointed general / permanent LPS conservator for the conservatee.

The 1-year duration for a general / permanent LPS conservatorship was again codified into the LPS Act to combat past abuses. This ensures that no individual is indefinitely detained in locked psychiatric care and that every year justification to continue the LPS conservatorship is brought before the court. This is another difference between LPS conservatorship and probate or limited conservatorship - both of which have no explicit expiration date. Indeed, if the LPS conservator does not submit a request to the court to renew the LPS conservatorship, by default it expires. Renewal of the LPS conservatorship requires that two mental health professionals formally declare that the LPS conservatorship still remains appropriate.

During a general / permanent LPS conservatorship, the conservatee is most likely held in long-term, locked psychiatric care. Although California state hospitals still exist and are in use, most LPS conservatees are placed at local (county level) psychiatric hospitals. Nothing in the LPS Act precludes a conservatee being under a LPS conservatorship and living in the community. No time frame is quantified in the LPS Act (as matters vary from conservatee to conservatee), but, in general, amongst the 58 county Public Guardian Offices, if a conservatee has been living in the community for an extended period of time, the legal justification to continue the LPS conservatorship diminishes and the conservatorship is likely to be dismissed. As such there is no common duration for a LPS conservatorship. It can indeed vary from a single LPS conservatorship lasting 30 years to multiple temporary LPS conservatorships being implemented over the course of a single year.

Some family of mentally ill individuals believe that the LPS act favors the individual's civil rights too much when weighed against their self-evident need for treatment. It can be very difficult for their family member to be placed on a 5150 hold or on a LPS conservatorship. The LPS Act requires a "grave disability" to provide oneself with food, clothing, or shelter. Thus an individual may indeed be highly symptomatic, displaying paranoia, delusions, mania, etc., but if he or she can present a cogent plan to care for food, clothing, and shelter, he or she may very well be released from psychiatric care. Some argued that revisions should be made to make it easier for individuals to be detained, lessening the restrictions required under the LPS Act.

In 2018, SB 1045 was signed into California law, establishing a pilot program in San Francisco, Los Angeles, and San Diego counties, if the counties approve. It would allow for the creation of a conservatorship for a person who is unable to care for his or her own health and well-being due to serious mental illness and substance use disorder. SB 1045 provides the least restrictive and most clinically appropriate alternative needed for the protection of persons incapable of caring for their own health.

== See also ==
- "5-1-5-0", a song about the policy
- California Mental Health Services Act
- Community Mental Health Act
- Disability rights movement
- Emergency psychiatry
- Florida Mental Health Act, a.k.a. the "Baker Act"
- Lanterman Developmental Disabilities Act
- Medically indigent adult
- Section 135/136 of the Mental Health Act, a similar policy in England and Wales
- Political abuse of psychiatry
- Wrongful involuntary commitment
