= Duplessis Orphans =

Canadian children wrongly classified as mentally ill

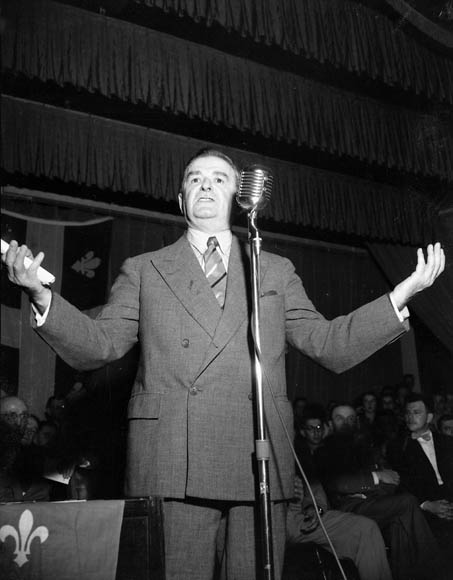
Maurice Duplessis in 1952

The Duplessis Orphans (French: les Orphelins de Duplessis) were a population of Canadian children misdiagnosed as mentally ill by the provincial government of Quebec and confined to psychiatric institutions in the 1940s and 1950s. Many of these children were deliberately miscertified in order to acquire additional subsidies from the federal government. They are named for Maurice Duplessis, who served as Premier of Quebec for five non-consecutive terms between 1936 and 1959. The controversies associated with Duplessis, and particularly the corruption and abuse concerning the Duplessis Orphans, have led to the popular historic conception of his term as Premier as La Grande Noirceur (French for 'The Great Darkness') by its critics.

The Duplessis Orphans have accused both the government of Quebec and the Catholic Church of wrongdoing. The Church has denied involvement in the scandal, and disputes the claims of those seeking financial compensation for harm done.

It is believed to be the second largest case of child abuse in Canadian history, after the Canadian Indian residential school system.

== Background ==
During the 1940s and 1950s, limited social services were available to residents of Quebec. Before the Quiet Revolution of the 1960s, most of the social services available were provided through the Catholic Church. Among their charges were people considered to be socially vulnerable: those living in poverty, alcoholics or other individuals deemed unable to retain work, unwed mothers, and orphans.

The Catholic Church urged many mothers to admit children to orphanages despite not having been formally orphaned due to their "bastard" status (being born to unwed mothers). Some of these orphanages were operated by Catholic religious institutions, due to a lack of secular investment in social services; they encouraged unwed mothers to leave their children there, so that they might be raised in the Catholic Church. Maternity homes for unwed mothers, too, then prevalent, often encouraged the giving up of these "bastard" children.

The Loi sur les Asiles d'aliénés (Lunatic Asylum Act) of 1909 governed mental institution admissions until 1950. The law stated the mentally ill could be committed for three reasons: to care for them, to help them, or as a measure to maintain social order in public and private life. However, the act did not define what a disruption of social order was, leaving the decision to admit patients up to psychiatrists.

The provincial government of Union Nationale Premier Maurice Duplessis received subsidies from the federal government for building hospitals, but received substantially fewer subsidies to support orphanages. Government contributions were only $1.25 a day for orphans, but $2.75 a day for psychiatric patients. This disparity in funding provided a strong financial incentive for reclassification. Under Duplessis, the provincial government was responsible for a significant number of healthy older children being deliberately classified as mentally ill and sent to psychiatric hospitals, based on diagnoses made for fiscal reasons. Duplessis also signed an order-in-council which changed the classification of orphanages into hospitals in order to provide them with federal subsidies.

A commission in the early 1960s investigating mental institutions after Duplessis' death revealed one-third of the 22,000 patients classified as "mentally ill" were classified as such for the province's financial benefit, and not due to any real psychiatric deficit. Following the publication of the Bédard report in 1962, the province ceased retaining the institutional notion of "asylum". When many of the orphans reached adulthood, in light of these institutional changes, they were permitted to leave the facilities.

== Impacts on orphans ==
Years later, long after these institutions were closed, survivors of the asylums began to speak out about child abuse which they endured at the hands of some staff and medical personnel. Many who have spoken publicly about their experiences say that they had been abused physically and sexually, and were subjected to lobotomies, electroshock and straitjackets.

In a psychiatric study completed by one of the involved hospitals, middle-aged Duplessis Orphans reported more physical and mental impairments than the control group. In addition, the orphans were less likely to be married or to have a healthy social life. 80% reported they had suffered a traumatic experience between the ages of 7 and 18. Over 50% said they had undergone physical, mental, or sexual abuse. About 78% reported difficulty functioning socially or emotionally in their adult life.

== Legal recourse in the 1990s ==
By the 1990s, about 3,000 survivors and a large group of supporters formed the Duplessis Orphans Committee, seeking damages from the Quebec provincial government. In March 1999, the provincial government made an offer of approximately CAD$15,000 as full compensation to each of the victims. The offer was rejected and the provincial government was harshly criticized, with Quebec's ombudsman at the time, Daniel Jacoby, saying that the government's handling of the affair trivialized the abuse alleged by the victims. In 2001, the claimants received an increased offer from the provincial government for a flat payment of $10,000 per person, plus an additional $1,000 for each year of wrongful confinement to a mental institution. The offer amounted to approximately $25,000 per orphan, but did not include any compensation for alleged victims of sexual or other abuse.

After the offer was accepted by representatives of the Duplessis Orphans Committee, the result was bitterly contested by other members upon learning that under the terms of the settlement, the committee's lawyer, president, and former public relations official would receive six- to seven-figure payments, in comparison with the paltry amount given to the actual victims. The committee subsequently voted to replace both the president and the public relations official. Critics of the judgment pointed out that three of the bureaucrats running the government's compensation program were being paid over $1,000 per day for work, whereas the orphans themselves received the same amount of money for an entire year of their confinement.

Seven religious communities were involved in operating some of the facilities: the Sisters of Providence, the Sisters of Mercy, the Grey Nuns of Montreal, the Sisters of Charity of Quebec, the Little Franciscans of Mary, the Brothers of Notre-Dame-de-la-Misericorde, and the Brothers of Charity. When the settlement with the provincial government was reached, the committee agreed to drop any further legal action against the Catholic Church. This offended some survivors; in 2006, one of the orphans, Martin Lécuyer, stated, "It's important for me, that the Church, the priests, that they recognize they were responsible for the sexual abuse, and the aggression. It's not for the government to set that peace... It's an insult, and it's the biggest proof that the government is an accomplice of the Church."

== Aftermath ==
In 1999, researchers Léo-Paul Lauzon and Martin Poirier issued a report arguing that both the Quebec provincial government and the Catholic Church made substantial profits by falsely certifying thousands of Quebec orphans as mentally ill during Duplessis' premiership. The authors made a conservative estimate that religious groups received $70 million in subsidies (measured in 1999 dollars) by claiming the children as "mentally deficient", while the government saved $37 million simply by having one of its orphanages redesignated from an educational institution to a psychiatric hospital. A representative of a religious order involved with the orphanages accused the authors of making "false assertions".

On March 4, 1999, after a criminal investigation where 240 Duplessis Orphans alleged 321 criminal accusations against those in charge of the hospitals, former Quebec Premier Lucien Bouchard declared a public apology to the orphans, but "without blaming or imputing legal responsibility to anyone."

In 2010, it was estimated that approximately 300–400 of the original Duplessis Orphans were still alive.

== Fate of human remains ==
In 2004, some Duplessis Orphans asked the Quebec government to unearth an abandoned cemetery in the east end of Montreal, which they believed to have held the remains of orphans who may have been the subject of human experimentation. According to testimony by individuals who were at the Cité de St-Jean-de-Dieu insane asylum, the orphans in the asylum's care were routinely used as non-consensual experimental subjects, and many died as a consequence. The group wanted the government to exhume the bodies so that autopsies may be performed. In November 2010, the Duplessis Orphans made their case before the United Nations Human Rights Council. In 2021, preliminary ground-penetrating radar analyses on grounds around former Canadian Indian residential schools allegedly indicated the presence of unmarked graves that could include the remains of Indigenous children that were also mainly administered by Christian churches. This has spurred further calls for the Quebec government and the Catholic Church to excavate former psychiatric hospital sites where the orphans were committed, with a class action lawsuit launched in 2018 denouncing the earlier settlement as "an insult" and not a "true apology" by the government and religious organizations.

== See also ==
- Anti-psychiatry
- Canadian Indian residential school system
- Child abuse
- Crimes against humanity
- Magdalene asylum
- Religious abuse
- Political abuse of psychiatry
- Project MKUltra
- Wrongful involuntary commitment
