= Political abuse of psychiatry =

Misuse of psychiatry to obstruct human rights

Political abuse of psychiatry, also known as punitive psychiatry, refers to the misuse of psychiatric diagnosis, detention, and treatment to suppress individual or group human rights in society. This abuse involves the deliberate psychiatric diagnosis of individuals who require neither psychiatric restraint nor treatment, often for political purposes.

Psychiatrists have been implicated in human rights abuses worldwide, particularly in states where diagnostic criteria for mental illness are expanded to include political disobedience. Scholars have long observed that government and medical institutions tend to label threats to authority as mentally ill during periods of political unrest. In many countries, political prisoners are confined and abused in psychiatric hospitals.

Psychiatry is uniquely vulnerable to being used for abusive purposes compared to other specialties of medicine. The power to diagnose mental illness allows the state to detain individuals against their will and administer unnecessary treatments under the guise of serving both individual and societal interests. This can be exploited to circumvent standard legal procedures for determining guilt or innocence, effectively incarcerating political dissidents while avoiding public scrutiny.

The use of psychiatric hospitals instead of prisons also prevents the victims from receiving legal aid, makes indefinite incarceration possible, and discredits the individual and their ideas. This allows authorities to avoid open trials when deemed undesirable.

The political abuse of medical power, particularly in psychiatry, has a long history, including notable examples during the Nazi era and Soviet rule, where religious and political dissenters were labeled "mentally ill" and subjected to inhumane "treatments". From the 1960s to 1986, systematic psychiatric abuse for political and ideological purposes was reported in the Soviet Union, with occasional occurrences in other Eastern European countries like Romania, Hungary, Czechoslovakia, and Yugoslavia.

The practice of incarcerating religious and political dissidents in psychiatric hospitals in the Eastern Bloc and the former USSR severely damaged the credibility of psychiatric practice in these states and drew strong condemnation from the international community. Similar abuses have been reported in the People's Republic of China. Psychiatric diagnoses, such as "sluggish schizophrenia" in the USSR, were specifically developed and used for political purposes. In the United States, psychiatry was used to control African-American slaves, a practice that some argue continues to this day.

== By country ==
=== Canada ===
The Duplessis Orphans were several thousand orphaned children that were falsely certified as mentally ill by the government of the province of Quebec, Canada, and confined to psychiatric institutions. The institutionalization occurred between 1935 and 1964.

Donald Ewen Cameron's operation was running from what is today known as the Allen Memorial Institute (AMI), part of the Royal Victoria Hospital, and not to be confused with the non-governmental organization based in Montreal, AMI-Québec Agir contre la maladie mentale.

=== China ===
In 2002, Human Rights Watch published the book Dangerous Minds: Political Psychiatry in China Today and its Origins in the Mao Era written by Robin Munro and based on the documents obtained by him. The British researcher Robin Munro, a sinologist who was writing his dissertation in London after a long sojourn in China, had traveled to China several times to survey libraries in provincial towns and while he was there, he had gathered a large amount of literature which bore the stamp 'secret' but at the same time, it was openly available. This literature even included historical analyses which were published during the Cultural Revolution and it concerned articles and reports on the number of people who were taken to mental hospitals because they complained about a series of issues. It was found, according to Munro, that the involuntary confinement of religious groups, political dissidents, and whistleblowers had a long history in China. The abuses began in the 1950s and 1960s, and they became extremely widespread throughout the Cultural Revolution. During the period of the Cultural Revolution, from 1966 to 1976, the political abuse of psychiatry reached its apogee in China, which was then under the rule of Mao Zedong and the Gang of Four, who established a very repressive and harsh regime. No deviance or opposition was tolerated, either in thought or in practice.

The documents described the massive abuses of psychiatry that were committed for political purposes during the rule of Mao Zedong, when millions of people were declared mentally sick. In the 1980s, according to official documents, fifteen percent of all forensic psychiatric cases had political connotations. In the early 1990s, the number of such cases had dropped to five percent, but with the beginning of the campaign against Falun Gong, the percentage of such cases increased quite rapidly.

Official Chinese psychiatric literature distinctly testifies that the Chinese Communist Party's notion of 'political dangerousness' was institutionally engrafted as the main concept in the diagnostic armory of China's psychiatry for a long time and its most important tool for suppressing opposition was the concept of psychiatric dangerousness.

Despite international criticism, China seems to be continuing its political abuse of psychiatry. Political abuse of psychiatry in China is high on the agenda and it has produced recurring disputes in the international psychiatric community. The abuses there appear to be even more widespread than they were in the Soviet Union in the 1970s and 1980s and they involve the incarceration of 'petitioners', human rights workers, trade union activists, members of the Falun Gong movement, and people who complain about injustices that have been committed against them by local authorities.

It also seems that China had no known high security forensic institutions until 1989. However, since then, the Chinese authorities have constructed an entire network of special forensic mental hospitals which are called Ankang which means 'Peace and Health' in Chinese. By that time, China had 20 Ankang institutions and their staff was employed by the Ministry of State Security (MSS). The psychiatrists who worked there wore uniforms under their white coats.

The political abuse of psychiatry in China only seems to take place in the institutions which are under the authority of the police and the MSS but it does not take place in those institutions which belong to other governmental sectors. Psychiatric care in China falls into four sectors which are hardly connected with each other. These are the Ankang institutions of the MSS; those which belong to the police; those which fall under the authority of the Ministry of Social Affairs; those which belong to the Ministry of Health. The sectors which belong to the police and the MSS are all closed to the public, and, consequently, information about them hardly ever leaks out. In the hospitals which belong to the Ministry of Health, psychiatrists do not have any contact with the Ankang institutions, and they have no idea of what occurred there, which means they can sincerely state that they were not informed about the political abuse of psychiatry in China.

In China, the structure of forensic psychiatry was to a great extent identical to that which existed in the Soviet Union. On its own, it is not so strange, since psychiatrists from the Moscow Serbsky Institute visited Beijing in 1957 in order to help their Chinese 'brethren', the same psychiatrists who promoted the system of political abuse of psychiatry in the Soviet Union. As a consequence, diagnostics in China were not much different than those which were made in the Soviet Union. The only difference was that the Soviet Union preferred "sluggish schizophrenia" as a diagnosis, and that China generally cleaved to the diagnosis of "paranoia" or "paranoid schizophrenia". However, the results were the same: long hospitalizations in mental hospitals, involuntary treatments with neuroleptics, torture, abuse, all of which were aimed at breaking the victim's will.

In accordance with Chinese law which contains the concept of "political harm to society" and the similar phrase dangerous mentally ill behavior, police take "political maniacs into mental hospitals, those who are defined as persons who write reactionary letters, make anti-government speeches, or "express opinions on important domestic and international affairs". Psychiatrists are frequently caught involved in such cases, unable and unwilling to challenge the police, according to psychiatry professor at the Peking University Yu Xin. As Liu's database suggests, today's most frequent victims of psychiatric abuse are political dissidents, petitioners, and Falun Gong members. In the beginning of the 2000s, Human Rights Watch accused China of locking up Falun Gong members and dissidents in a number of Chinese mental hospitals managed by the Public Security Bureau. Access to the hospitals was requested by the World Psychiatric Association (WPA), but denied by China, and the controversy subsided.

The WPA attempted to confine the problem by presenting it as Falun Gong issue and, at the same time, make the impression that the members of the movement were likely not mentally sound, that it was a sect which likely brainwashed its members, etc. There was even a diagnosis of 'qigong syndrome' which was used reflecting on the exercises practiced by Falun Gong. It was the unfair game aiming to avoid the political abuse of psychiatry from dominating the WPA agenda.

In August 2002, the General Assembly was to take place during the next WPA World Congress in Yokohama. The issue of Chinese political abuse of psychiatry had been placed as one of the final items on the agenda of the General Assembly. When the issue was broached during the General Assembly, the exact nature of compromise came to light. In order to investigate the political abuse of psychiatry, the WPA would send an investigative mission to China. The visit was projected for the spring of 2003 in order to assure that one could present a report during the annual meeting of the British Royal College of Psychiatrists in June/July of that year and the Annual Meeting of the American Psychiatric Association in May of the same year. After the 2002 World Congress, the WPA Executive Committee's half-hearted attitude in Yokohama came to light: it was an omen of a longstanding policy of diversion and postponement. The 2003 investigative mission never took place, and when finally a visit to China did take place, this visit was more of scientific exchange. In the meantime, the political abuse of psychiatry persisted unabatedly, nevertheless the WPA did not seem to care.

In August 2022, Safeguard Defenders issued an 85-page report on forced hospitalization in psychiatric hospitals between 2015 and 2021. Based on information from 144 cases, the report identifies 109 hospitals from 21 provinces in China, and documents repeated hospitalization of up to more than five times for victims. Some have spent around ten or more years inside. According to the report, victims are mostly petitioners and activists.

=== Cuba ===
Although Cuba has been politically connected to the Soviet Union since the United States broke off relations with Cuba shortly after Fidel Castro came to power in 1959, few considerable allegations regarding the political abuse of psychiatry in this country emerged before the late 1980s. Americas Watch and Amnesty International published reports alluding to cases of possible unwarranted hospitalization and ill-treatment of political prisoners. These reports concerned the Gustavo Machin hospital in Santiago de Cuba in the southeast of the country and the major mental hospital in Havana. In 1977, a report on alleged abuse of psychiatry in Cuba presenting cases of ill-treatment in mental hospitals going back to the 1970s came out in the United States. It presents grave allegations that prisoners end up in the forensic ward of mental hospitals in Santiago de Cuba and Havana where they undergo ill-treatment including electroconvulsive therapy without muscle relaxants or anaesthesia. The reported application of ECT in the forensic wards seems, at least in many of the cited cases, not to be an adequate clinical treatment for the diagnosed state of the prisoner—in some cases the prisoners seem not to have been diagnosed at all. Conditions in the forensic wards have been described in repulsive terms and apparently are in striking contrast to the other parts of the mental hospitals that are said to be well-kept and modern.

In August 1981, the Marxist historian Ariel Hidalgo was apprehended and accused of "incitement against the social order, international solidarity and the Socialist State" and sentenced to eight years' imprisonment. In September 1981, he was transported from State Security Headquarters to the Carbó-Serviá (forensic) ward of Havana Psychiatric Hospital where he stayed for several weeks.

=== Germany ===
Between 1933 and 1945, 275,000–300,000 people with disabilities were killed in the concentration camps as part of Hitler's eugenics program to purify the "Aryan race" from perceived undesirable traits in accordance with the Nazi ideology and its racial policies in the Third Reich. (Note: As many as 100,000 people may have been killed directly as part of Aktion T4. Mass euthanasia killings were also carried out in the Central and Eastern European countries and territories occupied by Nazi Germany during the war (see Nazi war crimes). Categories are fluid and no definitive figure can be assigned but historians put the total number of victims at around 300,000.) By 1936, killing of the "physically and socially unfit" became an accepted practice in Nazi Germany. In the 1940s, the abuse of psychiatry involved the abuse of the "duty to care" on an enormous scale: 300,000 individuals were involuntarily sterilized and 77,000 murdered in Nazi Germany alone and many thousands further afield, mainly in Nazi-occupied Central and Eastern Europe. Psychiatrists were instrumental in establishing a system of identifying, notifying, transporting, and killing hundreds of thousands of "racially and cognitively compromised" persons and the mentally ill in settings that ranged from centralized mental-hospitals to jails and death camps. Psychiatrists played a central and prominent role in sterilization and 'euthanasia', constituting two categories of the crimes against humanity. The taking of thousands of brains from 'euthanasia' victims demonstrated the way medical research was connected to the psychiatric killings. Germany operated six psychiatric extermination centers: Bernburg, Brandenburg, Grafeneck, Hadamar, Hartheim, and Sonnenstein. They played a crucial role in developments leading to the Holocaust.

=== India ===
It was reported in June, 2012, that the Indian Government has approached NIMHANS, a well known mental health establishment in South India, to assist in suppressing anti-nuclear protests regards to building of the Kudankulam Nuclear Power Plant. The government was in talks with NIMHANS representatives to chalk up a plan to dispatch psychiatrists to Kudankulam, for counselling protesters opposed to the building of the plant. To fulfill this, NIMHANS developed a team of six members, all of them from the Department of Social Psychiatry. The psychiatrists were sent to get a "peek into the protesters' minds" and help them learn the importance of the plant, according to one news source.

In July, 2013, the same institution, NIMHANS, was involved in a controversy where it was alleged that it provided assistance to the Central Bureau of Investigation relating to some interrogation techniques.

=== Japan ===
Japanese psychiatric hospitals during the country's imperial era reported an abnormally large number of patient deaths, peaking in 1945 after the surrender of Japan to Allied forces. The patients of these institutions were mistreated mainly because they were considered a hindrance to society. Under the Imperial Japanese government, citizens were expected to contribute in one way or another to the war effort, and the mentally ill were unable to do so, and as such were looked down upon and abused. The main cause of death for these patients was starvation, as caretakers did not supply the patients with adequate food, likely as a form of torture and a method of sedation. Because mentally ill patients were kept secluded from the outside world, the large number of deaths went unnoticed by the general public.

After the end of Allied occupation, the National Diet of Japan passed the Mental Hygiene Act (精神衛生法, Seishin Eisei Hō) in 1950, which improved the status of the mentally ill and prohibited the domestic containment of mental patients in medical institutions. However, the Mental Hygiene Act had unforeseen consequences. Along with many other reforms, the law prevented the mentally ill from being charged with any sort of crime in Japanese courts. Anyone who was found to be mentally unstable by a qualified psychiatrist was required to be hospitalized rather than incarcerated, regardless of the severity of any crime that person may have committed. The Ministry of Justice tried several times to amend the law, but was met with opposition from those who believed the legal system should not interfere with medical science.

After almost four decades, the Mental Health Act (精神保健法, Seishin Hoken Hō) was finally passed in 1987. The new law corrected the flaws of the Mental Hygiene Act by allowing the Ministry of Health and Welfare to set regulations on the treatment of mental patients in both medical and legal settings. With the new law, the mentally ill have the right to voluntary hospitalization, the ability to be charged with a crime, and right to use the insanity defense in court, and the right to pursue legal action in the event of abuse or negligence on the part of medical professionals.

=== Norway ===
There have been a few accusations about abuse of psychiatry in Norway. See Arnold Juklerød and Knut Hamsun.

=== Romania ===
In Romania, there have been allegations of some particular cases of psychiatric abuse during over a decade. In addition to particular cases, there is evidence that mental hospitals were utilized as short-term detainment centers. For instance, before the 1982 International University Sports 'Olympiad', over 600 dissidents were detained and kept out of public view in mental hospitals. Like in the Soviet Union, on the eve of Communist holidays, potential "troublemakers" were sent to mental hospitals by busloads and discharged when the holidays had passed.

The People's Republic of Romania held to a doctrine of state atheism. Many Christians, including those from the Baptist Church and Lord's Army wing of the Orthodox Church, were forced into psychiatric hospitals where they died.

=== Russia ===
Reports on particular cases continue to come from Russia where the worsening political climate appears to create an atmosphere in which local authorities feel able, once again, to use psychiatry as a means of intimidation.

=== Soviet Union ===
In 1971 detailed reports about the inmates of Soviet psychiatric hospitals who had been detained for political reasons began to reach the West. These showed that the periodic use of incarceration in psychiatric institutions during the 1960s (see the biography of Vladimir Bukovsky) had started to become a systematic way of dealing with dissent, political or religious. In accordance with the doctrine of state atheism, the USSR hospitalized individuals who were devout in their faith, such as many Baptist Christians.

In March 1971 Vladimir Bukovsky sent detailed diagnoses of six individuals (Natalya Gorbanevskaya and Pyotr Grigorenko among them) to psychiatrists in the West. They responded and over the next 13 years activists inside the USSR and support groups in Britain, Europe and North America conducted a sustained campaign to expose psychiatric abuses. In 1977 the World Psychiatric Association (WPA) condemned the USSR for this practice. Six years later, the Soviet All-Union Society of Neuropathologists and Psychiatrists seceded from the WPA rather than face almost certain expulsion.

During this period reports of continuous repression multiplied, but Soviet psychiatric officials refused to allow international bodies to see the hospitals and patients in question. They denied the charges of abuse. In February 1989, however, at the height of perestroika and over the opposition of the psychiatric establishment, the Soviet government permitted a delegation of psychiatrists from the United States, representing the U.S. government, to carry out extensive interviews of suspected victims of abuse.

The delegation was able systematically to interview and assess present and past involuntarily admitted mental patients chosen by the visiting team, as well as to talk over procedures and methods of treatment with some of the patients, their friends, relatives and, sometimes, their treating psychiatrists. The delegation originally sought interviews with 48 persons, but saw only 15 hospitalized and 12 discharged patients. About half of the hospitalized patients were released in the two months between the submission of the initial list of names to the Soviet authorities and the departure from the Soviet Union of the US delegation. The delegation concluded that nine of the 15 hospitalized patients had disorders which would be classified in the United States as serious psychoses, diagnoses corresponding broadly with those used by the Soviet psychiatrists. One of the hospitalized patients had been diagnosed as having schizophrenia although the US team saw no evidence of mental disorder. Among the 12 discharged patients examined, the US delegation found that nine had no evidence of any current or past mental disorder; the remaining three had comparatively slight symptoms which would not usually warrant involuntary commitment in Western countries. According to medical records, all these patients had diagnoses of psychopathology or schizophrenia. The authorities had justified compulsory psychiatric treatment by slow and weak forms of schizophrenia – a so-called "latent schizophrenia" according to a concept of Eugen Bleuler. Such forms would allegedly make the sufferer prone to criminal acts.

Returning home after a visit of more than two weeks, the delegation members wrote a report which was highly damaging to the Soviet authorities. The delegation established that there had been systematic political abuse of psychiatry in the past and that it had not yet come to an end. Victims continued to be held in mental hospitals, while the Soviet authorities and the Soviet Society of Psychiatrists and Neuropathologists in particular still denied that psychiatry had been employed as a method of repression.

The American report and other pressures, domestic and external, led the Politburo to pass a resolution (15 November 1989) "On improvements in Soviet law concerning procedures for the treatment of psychiatric patients".

=== Suriname ===
Louis Doedel (1905–1980) was a trade unionist. He was involuntary committed in psychiatric hospital Wolfenbüttel on 28 May 1937 by Governor Kielstra. Doedel was forgotten and presumed dead. It was not until 1979, 42 years later, that he was released.

=== Thailand ===
Following the 2014 Thai coup d'état, there were a few cases where the National Council for Peace and Order (NCPO, the Thai military junta) alleged its opponents, including a protesting schoolchild, Nattanan Warintawaret, were mentally disturbed. In addition, the military junta introduced a systematic process of 'attitude adjustment', whereby hundreds of dissidents were subjected to forcible detention and propaganda until they reformed their views of the junta; the majority did not and were subsequently charged with crimes. While psychiatrists were not employed, a team of psychologists was involved, implying psychological warfare rather than political psychiatry.^{:453}

On 9 July 2020 Tiwagorn Withiton, a Facebook user who went viral after posting a picture of himself wearing a t-shirt printed with the message "I lost faith in the monarchy" was forcibly detained by police officers and admitted to Rajanagarindra Psychiatric Hospital in Khon Kaen. Tiwagorn has stated that he does not wish the Thai monarchy to be abolished but 'loss of faith' may imply lèse-majesté, a serious crime in Thailand. Tiwagorn is quoted as saying, "I well understand that it is political to have to make people think I'm insane. I won't hold it against the officials if there is a diagnosis that I'm insane, because I take it that they have to follow orders." Subsequent to protests by civil rights groups and media stories, Tiwagorn was released by Rajanagarindra Psychiatric Hospital, on July 22, 2020.

=== United States ===
- "Drapetomania" was a supposed mental illness described by American physician Samuel A. Cartwright in 1851 that caused black slaves to flee captivity. In addition to inventing drapetomania, Cartwright prescribed a remedy. His feeling was that with "proper medical advice, strictly followed, this troublesome practice that many Negroes have of running away can be almost entirely prevented". In the case of slaves "sulky and dissatisfied without cause"—a warning sign of imminent flight—Cartwright prescribed "whipping the devil out of them" as a "preventative measure". As a remedy for this disease, doctors also made running a physical impossibility by prescribing the removal of both big toes. Cartwright also proposed "dysaesthesia aethiopica" as a mental illness that caused laziness among slaves.
- In the United States, political dissenters have been involuntarily committed. For example, in 1927 a demonstrator named Aurora D'Angelo was sent to a mental health facility for psychiatric evaluation after she participated in a rally in support of Sacco and Vanzetti.
- When Clennon W. King, Jr., an African-American pastor and activist of the Civil Rights Movement, attempted to enroll at the all-white University of Mississippi for summer graduate courses in 1958, the Mississippi police arrested him on the grounds that "any [Black person] who tried to enter Ole Miss must be crazy". Keeping King's whereabouts secret for 48 hours, the Mississippi authorities kept him confined to a mental hospital for twelve days before a panel of doctors established the activist's sanity.
- In the 1964 election, Fact magazine polled American Psychiatric Association members on whether Barry Goldwater was fit to be president and published "The Unconscious of a Conservative: A Special Issue on the Mind of Barry Goldwater". This led to the adoption of an ethical rule against diagnosis of public figures by a clinician who has not performed an examination or been authorized to release information by the patient. This became the Goldwater rule.
- In 2010, the book The Protest Psychosis: How Schizophrenia Became a Black Disease by psychiatrist Jonathan Metzl (who also has a Ph.D. in American studies) was published. The book covers the history of the 1960s Ionia State Hospital located in Ionia, Michigan, now converted to a prison, and focuses on exposing the trend of this hospital to diagnose African Americans with schizophrenia because of their civil rights ideas. The book suggests that in part the sudden influx of such diagnoses could be traced to a change in wording in the DSM-II, which compared to the previous edition added "hostility" and "aggression" as signs of the disorder.
- Clinical psychologist Bruce E. Levine argues that oppositional defiant disorder, which can be easily used to pathologize anti-authoritarianism, is an abuse of psychiatry.
- In 2014, The Mercury News published a series of articles detailing questionable use of psychotropic drugs within California's foster care system where bad behavior is attributed to various mental conditions, and little care is provided besides drugs. Likewise, many experts questioned the long-term effects of high dosages on developing brains, and some former patients reported permanent side effects even after ceasing to take the medication.
- In March 2025, Minnesota Senate Republicans introduced a bill that seeks to classify "Trump Derangement Syndrome" as a mental illness. The bill has proposed that the condition is linked to extreme "reactions to the policies and presidency" of Donald Trump which should be recognised in legal and medical contexts. The bill sparked controversy and concern.

==== California ====
- "5150 hold" – There are many instances of usage of California law section 5150, which allows for involuntary psychiatric hold based on the opinion of a law enforcement official, psychological professional (or many other individuals who hold no qualification for making psychological assessment), which have been challenged as being unrelated to safety, and misused as an extension of political power.

==== New York ====
Whistleblowers who part ranks with their organizations have had their mental stability questioned, such as, for example, NYPD veteran Adrian Schoolcraft who was coerced to falsify crime statistics in his department and then became a whistleblower. In 2010 he was forcibly committed to a psychiatric hospital.

== See also ==
- Anti-psychiatry
- Controversies about psychiatry
- Global Initiative on Psychiatry
- Institutionalisation
- Medical torture
  - Pharmacological torture
- Medically indigent adult
- Patient abuse
- Trump derangement syndrome
- Unethical human experimentation
- Wrongful involuntary commitment
