= 5150 =

5150 may refer to:

- Lanterman–Petris–Short Act § 5150 hold, section 5150 of California's Welfare and Institutions Code
  - By extension, a person who is gravely disabled through mental illness
- 5150 Studios, Eddie Van Halen's home recording studio, named after the psychiatric hold code section
- Peavey 5150, guitar amplifier, signature model for Eddie Van Halen
- 5150 (album), a 1986 album by Van Halen
- 5150: Home 4 tha Sick, a 1992 EP by Eazy-E
- IBM 5150, model designation for the IBM Personal Computer
- Dell Inspiron#Inspiron 5150
- 5150 series, a triathlon series organized by the World Triathlon Corporation
- 5150 (professional wrestling), professional wrestling group
- A nickname for subsidized biodiesel in Indonesia, since subsidized biodiesel in Indonesia was priced IDR 5150 (approximately USD 0.4)

== Songs ==
- "5150", a song by Van Halen
- "5150", a song by the Oral Cigarettes
- "5150", a song by Love Fame Tragedy
- "5150", a song by Tsunami Bomb from the album The Definitive Act
- "5150", a 1995 song by Luniz from the album Operation Stackola
- "5150", a song by Machine Gun Kelly from the album Mainstream Sellout
- "E5150", a song by Black Sabbath from the 1981 album Mob Rules
- "5-1-5-0", a song by Dierks Bentley from the album Home
- "5150", a song by Sematary
- "5150", a song by Ice Cube from the album Man Down
