= Eleanor Riese =

American medical plaintiff (1943–1991)

Eleanor Jeanne Riese
- Born: September 4, 1943; San Francisco, California
- Died: April 6, 1991 (aged 47); San Francisco, California
- Known for: Class-action lawsuit against the St. Mary's Hospital in San Francisco

Eleanor Riese (September 4, 1943 – April 6, 1991) was an American patient who sued a hospital for her right to refuse antipsychotic medication. The court decision significantly changed the approach to psychiatric patients.

== Biography ==
Riese was diagnosed with schizophrenia when she was 25 years old.

=== Lawsuit ===
In 1985, Riese led a class-action lawsuit against the St. Mary's Hospital in San Francisco. Her lawyer, Colette Hughes, argued that during her stay there, Riese developed symptoms caused by antipsychotic medication she did not consent to.

The lawsuit was remarkable for its time and quickly went national, attracting the attention of advocacy groups and organizations such as the American Psychiatric Association and the American Psychological Association. Finally, in 1987, California Court of Appeals in a unanimous ruling about Riese v. St. Mary’s Hospital and Medical Center suit decided that antipsychotic medications "may not be prescribed to involuntarily committed mental patients in non-emergency situations without their informed consent".

== See also ==
- Frances Farmer
- Nellie Bly
- Lanterman–Petris–Short Act
- Involuntary treatment
- Patient abuse
- Controversies about psychiatry
