= Donald D. Doyle =

American politician

Member of the California State Assembly from the 10th district
- In office January 5, 1953 - January 5, 1959
- Preceded by: Robert Condon
- Succeeded by: Jerome Waldie

Personal details
- Born: February 6, 1915 Dinuba, California, U.S.
- Died: January 31, 2011 (aged 95) Oakland, California, U.S.
- Party: Republican
- Spouse(s): Thelma Forsmann (m. 1941; died 2000) Helen Humble
- Children: 2

Military service
- Allegiance: United States
- Branch/service: United States Marine Corps
- Battles/wars: World War II

Donald D. Doyle (February 6, 1915 – January 31, 2011) served in the California legislature and during World War II he served in the United States Marine Corps.

While serving in the California Assembly from January 5, 1953 to January 5, 1959, Doyle co-authored the Short-Doyle Mental Health Act with California Senator Alan Short and authored legislation creating the ferry boat transportation system between Benicia and Martinez.
