= Bruce E. Levine =

American psychologist

Bruce E. Levine is an American clinical psychologist in private practice in Cincinnati, Ohio. He has written and spoken on the relationships among society, culture, politics, and psychology.

Levine's 2018 book Resisting Illegitimate Authority: A Thinking Person's Guide to Being an Anti-Authoritarian examines psychological and social factors underlying resistance to authority and critiques what he characterizes as excessive conformity in modern society. The book discusses historical and contemporary examples of individuals who challenged established authority structures.

Levine has written about substance use and treatment resistance, suggesting that some individuals may not benefit from conventional treatment approaches and emphasizing the importance of broader psychological and social factors. He has also discussed the relationship between economic pressures and individual well-being.

His 2011 book Get Up, Stand Up: Uniting Populists, Energizing the Defeated, and Battling the Corporate Elite argues for changes in political engagement in response to what he describes as widespread political demoralization.

In Surviving America's Depression Epidemic (2007), Levine argues that social and cultural factors contribute significantly to depression and critiques aspects of contemporary mental health practice.

Levine is also the author of Commonsense Rebellion: Taking Back Your Life from Drugs, Shrinks, Corporations and a World Gone Crazy (2001), which critiques what he describes as institutional influences on mental health and behavior.

Levine contributed the article "Troubled children and teens: Commonsense solutions without psychiatric drugs and manipulations" to the book Alternatives Beyond Psychiatry (2007), edited by Peter Stastny and Peter Lehmann.

== See also ==
- Anti-psychiatry
