= List of University of Missouri–Kansas City people =

The following is a list of notable people associated with the University of Missouri–Kansas City, located in the American city of Kansas City, Missouri.

== Notable alumni ==
=== Politics and government ===
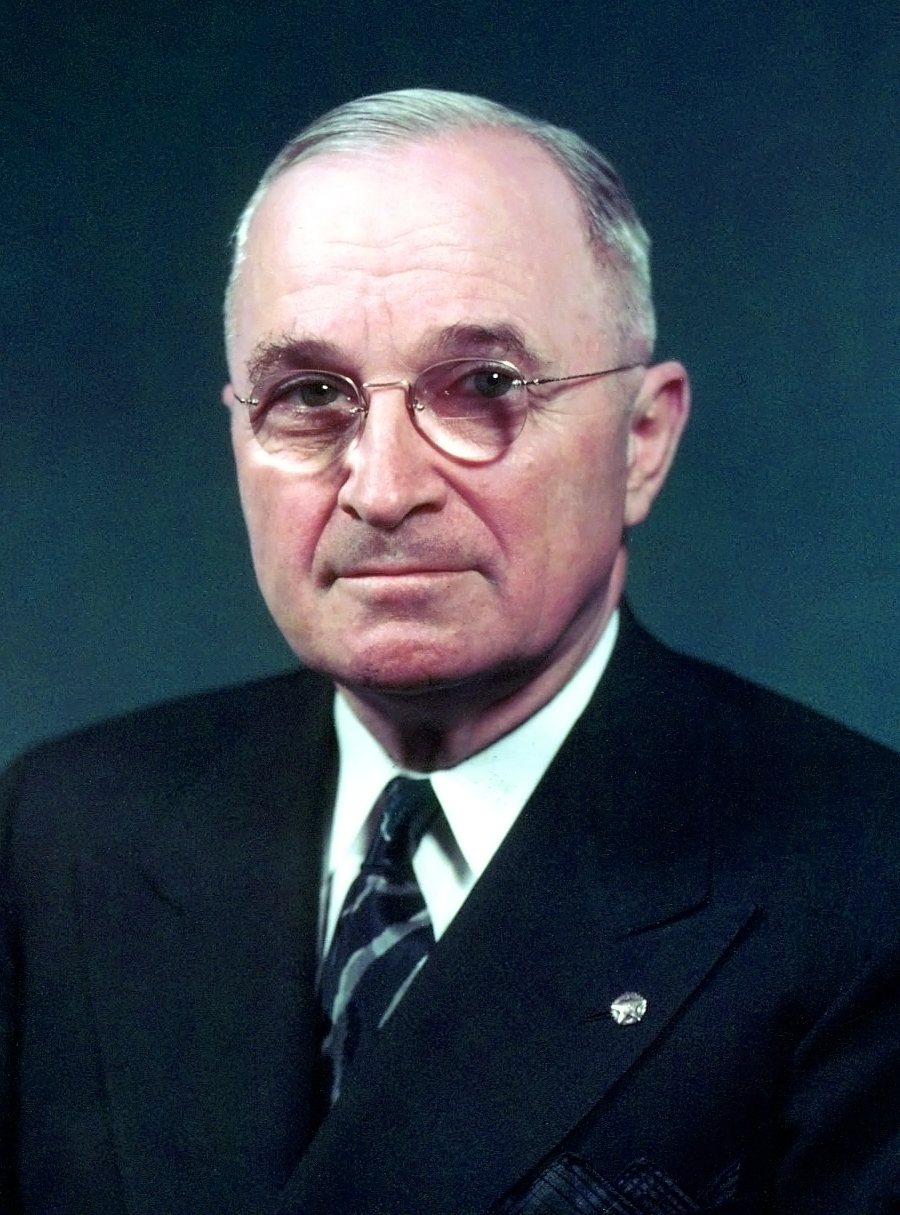
Harry S. Truman

- Brian Birdwell, Texas state senator
- Hilary A. Bush, Missouri lieutenant governor
- Sharice Davids, member of the U.S. House of Representatives for Kansas' 3rd District
- David F. Duncan, drug policy consultant to President Bill Clinton
- Zel Fischer, Missouri Supreme Court judge
- Jeffrey Friedman, mayor of Austin, Texas
- Allan J. Katz, city commissioner of Tallahassee and Ambassador to Portugal
- Clarence M. Kelley, director of the Federal Bureau of Investigation, 1973–1978
- Donald L. Manford, Missouri state senator
- Melissa Oropeza, current member of the Kansas House of Representatives
- Sam Page, Missouri state representative for six years, and 2008 candidate for Missouri's lieutenant governor
- Bill Reardon, Kansas politician
- Rick Scott, US senator
- Clarence Senior, executive secretary of the Socialist Party of America and academic
- Katheryn Shields, Jackson County executive
- Harry S. Truman, president of the United States (attended night classes at the Law School but never graduated from any college)
- William L. Webster, Missouri politician
- Charles Evans Whittaker, associate justice, Supreme Court of the United States

=== Athletics ===
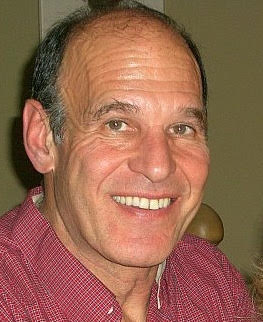
Bob Stein

- Roberto Albuquerque, soccer defender, USL Championship (USL)
- Manny Catano, soccer midfielder, USISL, Eastern Indoor Soccer League, and the National Premier Soccer League (NPSL)
- Levi Coleman, soccer forward, USL and NPSL
- Kevin Corby, soccer goalkeeper, Major Arena Soccer League and USL
- Tony Dumas, basketball player for the Dallas Mavericks; the only player from UMKC to be drafted in the NBA (1994)
- Donald Fehr, executive director, National Hockey League Players' Association
- Eric McWoods, soccer forward, League of Ireland Premier Division
- Jony Muñoz, soccer midfielder, 2020 Gatorade Boys' Soccer Player of the Year
- Bryan Pérez, soccer midfielder, United States Soccer Federation, USL, MASL
- Mike Racy (J.D., 1992), former NCAA vice president (1993–2013); current commissioner for the Mid-America Intercollegiate Athletics Association (2017–present)
- Jordan Rideout, soccer forward, USL
- Connor Sparrow, soccer goalkeeper, Major League Soccer and USL
- Bob Stein (born 1948), football linebacker; College Football Hall of Fame, Jewish Sports Hall of Fame, Super Bowl champion; played for the Kansas City Chiefs, Los Angeles Rams, Minnesota Vikings, and San Diego Chargers; graduated in the top 10% of the UMKC Law School
- Deshon Taylor (born 1996), basketball player for Hapoel Haifa of the Israeli Basketball Premier League

=== Business ===
- Thomas D. Barr (1931–2008), prominent lawyer at Cravath, Swaine & Moore
- Henry W. Bloch (1922–2019), businessman and philanthropist, co-founded tax-preparation company H&R Block
- Jay B. Dillingham, president of the Kansas City Stockyards

=== Media and arts ===
- Ike Amadi, voice actor
- Rita Blitt (born Rita Copaken; 1931), painter, sculptor, and filmmaker
- Robert Brookmeyer, jazz trombonist
- Danny Carey, drummer for the band Tool
- Rajiv Chilaka, creator of cartoon TV programs, most notable for Chhota Bheem
- Vinson Cole, opera tenor
- Nick Gehlfuss, actor
- Tara Dawn Holland, Miss America 1997
- Mark Katzman, writer and musician
- Mike Keefe, Pulitzer Prize-winning cartoonist
- Suzanne Klotz (born 1944), painter and sculptor
- Edie McClurg, actress
- James Mobberley, composer and musician
- Mikel Rouse, music composer
- Craig Stevens, actor
- Leith Stevens, film composer
- Shelby Storck, television producer
- Connor Trinneer, actor
- Hazel Volkart, composer
- J. Michael Yates, poet and dramatist

=== Science, technology, and medicine ===
- John D. Carmack, video game programmer
- Juris Hartmanis, computer scientist, Turing Award by ACM (considered the Nobel Prize of Computing)
- Jonathan Metzl (born 1964), psychiatrist and author, Frederick B. Rentschler II Professor of Sociology and Psychiatry at Vanderbilt University, and the author of multiple books, including The Protest Psychosis and Dying of Whiteness

== Notable faculty ==
- William K. Black, lawyer, author, former bank regulator, and developer of the concept of "control fraud"
- Moissaye Boguslawski (1887–1944), pianist, composer, editor and teacher
- John Ciardi (1916–1986), poet, translator of Dante
- Louis Colaianni, author, voice and speech coach
- Vinson Cole, voice teacher, international opera singer (tenor)
- Horace B. Davis, Marxian economist, fired in 1954 after refusing to testify before HUAC
- John Ezell, award-winning scenic designer, Hall Family Foundation Professor of Design
- Mark Funkhouser, former mayor of Kansas City, Missouri
- J. Camille Hall, vice chancellor for diversity and inclusion
- Michael Hudson, research professor of economics and former Wall Street analyst
- Jason Kander (born 1981), attorney, author, veteran, former Missouri Secretary of State
- Benny Kim, associate professor of violin
- Kris Kobach, Kansas secretary of state, on leave as Daniel L. Brenner Professor of Law, former White House fellow
- Jan Kregel, post-Keynesian economist, professor of economics
- John D. Lantos (born 1954), pediatrician, expert in medical ethics, Professor of Pediatrics
- Felicia Hardison Londré, theatre historian and dramaturg, Dean of the College of Fellows of the American Theatre
- Zhou Long, contemporary classical composer, professor of musical composition, Pulitzer Prize-winning composer
- Yudell Luke (1918–1983), mathematician, awarded the N. T. Veatch award for Distinguished Research and Creative Activity, Curator's Professor
- Ernest Manheim, sociologist, namesake of Manheim Hall
- Tom Mardikes, sound designer, music producer, Chair of UMKC Theatre
- Hans Morgenthau (1904–1980), political scientist and founder of classical realism in international relations
- Ryan Pore (born 1983), former professional soccer player, and head coach of the Roos men's soccer team since January 2020
- Richard Rhodes, Pulitzer Prize-winning author
- Noliwe Rooks, one of the first Black professors in the College of Arts and Sciences, associate director of African-American program at Princeton University, W.E.B. Du Bois Professor of Literature at Cornell University, chair of/professor in Africana Studies Department at (and founding director of Segrenomics Lab at) Brown University
- Mei-Ling Shyu, professor of electrical and computer engineering
- Theodore Swetz, actor, stage director, and professor
- Whitney Terrell, author, journalist, and professor
- Bobby Watson, jazz saxophonist
- Chen Yi, contemporary classical composer, professor of musical composition
- Rich Zvosec, former basketball coach
