= Theodore Swetz =

American actor, educator, theatre director (born 1953)

Theodore "Ted" Swetz (born March 21, 1953) is an American actor, theatre director, and educator.

He is the head of acting at UMKC Theatre, an academic department of the University of Missouri–Kansas City in Kansas City, Missouri.

== Early life, education, and early career ==
Swetz was born and raised in Yonkers, New York, and completed his Bachelor of Arts degree at Lehman College in 1976 in New York City.

During his undergraduate career as a performer, Swetz acted in multiple productions at the New York Shakespeare Festival, performing at both Central Park and Lincoln Center.

Following graduation, Swetz continued his study of acting and theatrical production under major American stage luminaries, including Stella Adler, Phoebe Brand, and Morris Carnovsky, all of whom served as members of the influential Group Theatre founded in New York City during the early 1930s.

== Career ==
In 1980, Swetz began work as an actor with the American Players Theatre (APT), helping to open the company in Spring Green, Wisconsin, and later acting, teaching, and directing there for almost a decade. During founder Randall Duk Kim's leave of absence in 1988, Swetz took on a two-year position as assistant artistic director of the company under artistic director Anne Occhiogrosso. He announced his resignation from the APT in 1989, and left the company in 1990, in order to begin teaching at UMKC.

While in Kansas City, Swetz served as an artistic associate of the Missouri Repertory Theatre (now the Kansas City Repertory Theatre) while simultaneously working as an instructor at UMKC.

After over a decade of working in the Kansas City area, Swetz accepted a position as associate professor of acting and directing at Binghamton University in Binghamton, New York. After a time as a member of the Binghamton University faculty, Swetz eventually, after accepting the position of Patricia McIlrath Endowed Chair in Theatre Arts in Acting at UMKC, returned to the Kansas City area in order to serve as Head of UMKC Theatre's Master of Fine Arts acting program.

Swetz's regional directing and acting credits includes productions with the Unicorn Theatre, the Commonweal Theatre Company, the Kansas City Repertory Theatre, the Kansas City Actors Theatre, the Coterie Theatre, the Nebraska Repertory Theatre, the Heart of America Shakespeare Festival, and the Riverside Shakespeare Festival, where Swetz was elected to serve as an artistic associate.
