= Cynthia Levin =

American stage director and theatre producer

Cynthia Levin is an American stage director and theatre producer. She was the producing artistic director of the Unicorn Theatre (Kansas City) in Kansas City, Missouri until she retired in 2024.

== Early life ==
Levin was born and raised in Washington, D.C. She attended Park University in Parkville, Missouri, where she majored in theatre and graduated magna cum laude in 1977.

== Career ==
After college, Levin briefly worked for the Missouri Repertory Theatre (now the Kansas City Repertory Theatre), as well as various summer stock theatre and local Kansas-City-based theatres. In 1979, she was hired by the Theatre Workshop in Kansas City, which became the Unicorn Theatre in the early 1980s. During her early years at the Unicorn, Levin acted, directed, stage managed, and designed for numerous productions. She became the artistic director of the Unicorn in 1982 and has guided the theatre in its mission to produce new and bold contemporary plays, particularly those which have not yet received Kansas City premieres. She retired after 45 years after the 23-24 season. Levin has served as a director, actor, or designer for over 260 Unicorn productions, and has directed plays for UMKC Theatre and the Coterie Theatre in Kansas City. She has also directed multiple world-premiere readings at the Kennedy Center in Washington D.C. Levin is a founding board member of the National New Play Network.

== Honors and awards ==
In 1995, Levin was named one of Kansas City's “Local Heroes” by Ingram’s. In 2000, the Unicorn Theatre received the Missouri Arts Council’s Arts Award. Levin was awarded an honorary doctorate from Park University in 2002. She has also been the recipient of the Pinnacle of Excellence in the Arts Award from the Johnson County Library Foundation, the Human Rights Campaign Award, and the GLAAD Leadership Award.
