= Manford =

Manford is a surname. Notable people with the surname include:

- Donald Manford (1934–1991), American politician
- Jason Manford (born 1981), English comedian, singer, television presenter, and actor
- Jeanne Manford (1920–2013), American activist
