= Londra =

Londra may refer to:

- the Italian, Romanian and Turkish name for London, UK
- Michael Londra (born 1965), Irish singer and theatrical producer
- Paulo Londra (born 1998), Argentine rapper, singer and composer

== See also ==
- Londre
