= McIlrath =

McIlrath is a surname. Notable people with the surname include:

- Dylan McIlrath (born 1992), Canadian ice hockey player
- Patricia McIlrath (1917–1999), American educator and theatre director
- Tim McIlrath (born 1978), American punk rock musician

== See also ==
- McGrath
