= Tom Mardikes =

Tom Mardikes (born January 27, 1953) is an American sound designer and theatre educator. He served as Professor and Head of Graduate Sound Design for UMKC Theatre, an academic department of the University of Missouri-Kansas City. He retired from UMKC in August 2026 after 45 years of teaching.

== Early life ==
Mardikes was born in Kansas City, Missouri. He obtained a B.A. in English from the University of Missouri-Kansas City and an M.F.A. in Theatre Design and Technology (specializing in Sound Design), also at UMKC.

== Career ==
Mardikes began teaching at the University of Missouri-Kansas City in 1978, and became Head of Graduate Sound Design for UMKC Theatre in 1986. During his tenure as Head of Graduate Sound Design, Mardikes helped to build the program into one of the most well-respected graduate sound design programs in the United States. In 2001, he was elected chair of the UMKC Department of Theatre and served through 2017.

As a sound designer, Mardikes has taken part in over 250 professional theatre productions. He has served as resident sound designer for the Missouri Repertory Theatre (now the Kansas City Repertory Theatre), the Heart of America Shakespeare Festival, and the Kansas City Actors Theatre, as well as completing freelance work with the Great Lakes Theater, the Repertory Theatre of St. Louis, the Unicorn Theatre, and many others.

In 1986, Mardikes founded the City Spark recording studio in Kansas City, where he served as president and producer.

During the 1990s, Mardikes developed an influential sound playback technique known as "MS-Stereo." This work led to the later development of the Sound Mandala.

In 2004, he created TixKC.com, a 1/2-price, day-of-sale virtual performing arts kiosk established as a joint project between UMKC Central Ticket Office and 11 other Kansas City-based performing arts organizations. WDAF-TV/ Fox 4 of Kansas City served as a major media sponsor promoting the kiosk.

In addition to his career as a teacher and sound designer, Mardikes is a co-founder of the Kansas City Actors Theatre (KCAT), formed in 2004. He is an active member of the United States Institute for Theatre Technology (USITT), where he has served as Commissioner and Vice Commissioner of Sound Design. Mardikes was also one of five professional sound designers who helped facilitate the organization of sound designers into the United Scenic Artists (USA) Local 829 which has led to the official recognition of sound design by the League of Resident Theatres (LORT) and professional theatres nationwide, and authoring the Sound Design examination for new designers. Among the topics of his published writing include examinations into copyright practices and licensing for sound design in the theatre.

In March 2010 at the USITT 50th Anniversary Conference held in Kansas City, Mardikes organized a group of the nation's top graduate theatre design programs to create a new event to be held annually in New York City to present the best graduating theatre design students to the theatre profession. National Design Portfolio Review held its first event in May 2011 and has continued annually, and grown to a membership of 15 prominent schools, sending 70-some presenters to New York for a show held in the Paulson Center at NYU.

He served as chair or past-chair of the UMKC Faculty Senate from 2019 to 2024. Key issues included working with the UMKC administration on a COVID response as well as a temporary reduction in salaries for all UMKC employees during a dire financial situation.

Mardikes' principal research project has been using multiple loudspeakers in a theatre space and employing a matrix of loudspeakers to achieve a distributed sound, with many instruments and sounds coming from their own loudspeaker, and to moving sound through this matrix in unique ways. He began with a 16-channel system in Spencer Theatre, experimenting for two weeks in 1997. Advances in computer processing power and Pro Tools as the primary audio application advanced in 2014 to where Mardikes began to experiment with 36-channel, 48-channel and 80-channel systems. In July 2024, he organized a 50-minute audio program presented during the KC Fringe Festival, featuring 50 people seated and surrounded by 80 discrete loudspeakers. Over 800 people attended the event, and it won a Best of Show award from KC Fringe; it was also featured in the "Best of KC 2024" review in the Kansas City Pitch.

In summer of 2026 (June 10 - August 1), Mardikes, along with primary composer and collaborator Jon Robertson expanded the system to 100 discrete loudspeakers for a multi-week residency at Unicorn Theater in Kansas City, Missouri. housed in a custom-built hexagonal acoustic space, the 2026 run featured three distinct programs: the variety showcase Signal and Soul, the music series Indie Spotlight featuring Challenger Artists, and a screening of the 1920 silent film The Cabinet of Dr. Caligari with an original spatial score by Thomas Newby and The Green Zoo. That movie screening marked the project's first incorporation of a visual component, and it was praised by The Pitch for its precision and immersive spatial effects. Later that year, IN Kansas City Magazine named Mardikes one of its "2026 Kansas City Innovators and Influencers" for its work on Sound Mandala.
