= Dysaesthesia aethiopica =

Alleged mental illness linked to scientific racism

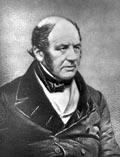
Samuel Cartwright, 1793–1863

In psychiatry, dysaesthesia aethiopica (literally "Ethiopian bad feeling", "black bad feeling") was an alleged mental illness described by American physician Samuel A. Cartwright in 1851, which proposed a theory for the cause of laziness among slaves. Today, dysaesthesia aethiopica is not recognized as a disease, but instead considered an example of pseudoscience, and part of the edifice of scientific racism.

== History ==
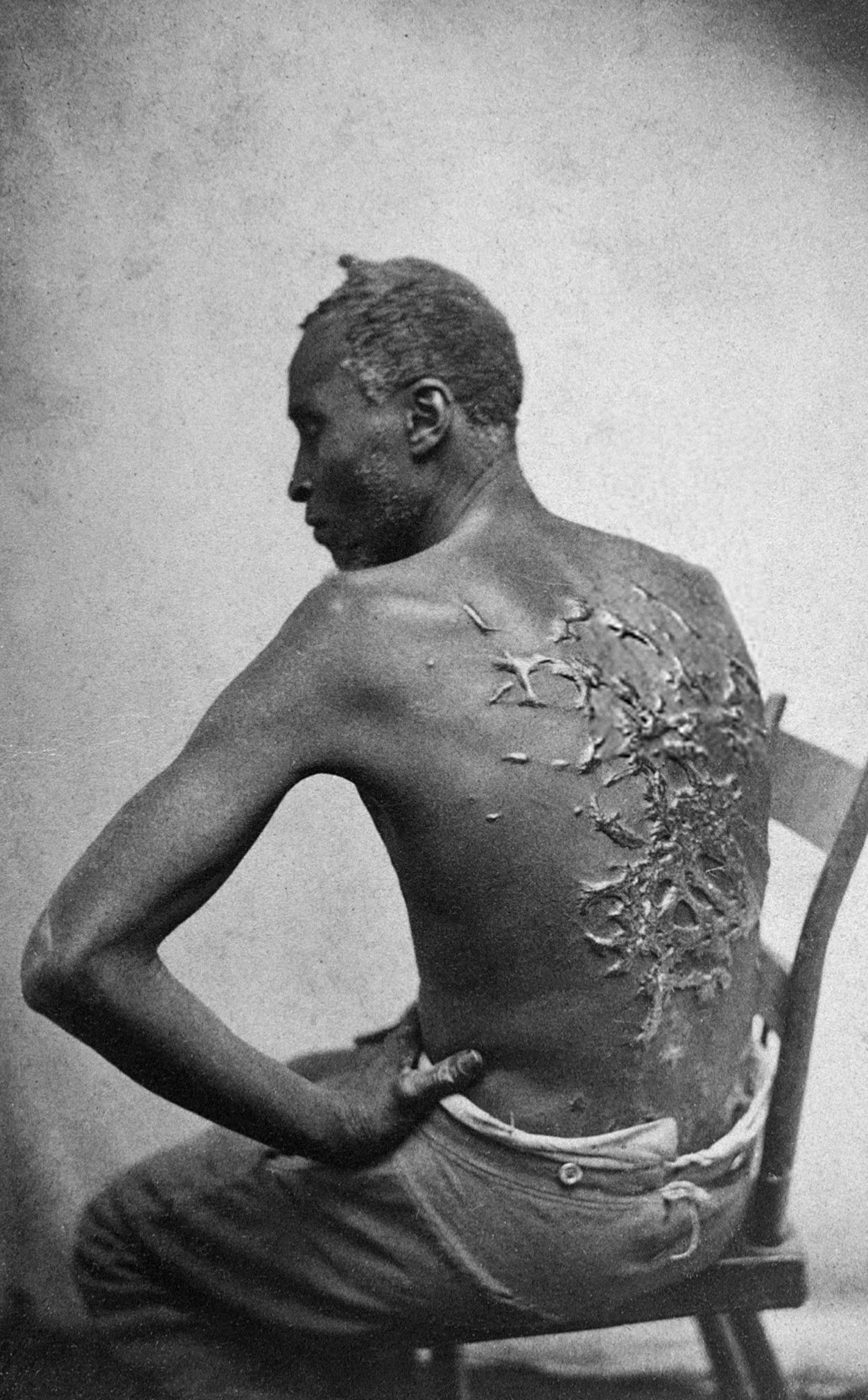
Lesions on the back of an enslaved African from Mississippi

Applied exclusively to African Americans, dysaesthesia aethiopica was characterized by partial insensitivity of the skin and "so great a hebetude of the intellectual faculties, as to be like a person half asleep." Other symptoms included dry, thick, rough skin and "lesions of the body discoverable to the medical observer, which are always present and sufficient to account for the symptoms." Cartwright contended that the existence of dysaesthesia aethiopica was "clearly established by the most direct and positive testimony," but other doctors had failed to notice it because their "attention [had] not been sufficiently directed to the maladies of the negro race."

Cartwright said that overseers referred to this condition as "rascality", as if the slaves' clumsiness and erratic actions were intentional, but he disagreed, claiming that it was in fact a physical disease, which he believed was caused by the blood being "highly carbonized and deprived of oxygen" due to "idleness" or bad diet. He felt that it was "easily curable, if treated on sound physiological principles." Insensitivity of the skin was one symptom of the disease, so the skin should be stimulated:

The best means to stimulate the skin is, first, to have the patient well washed with warm water and soap; then, to anoint it all over in oil, and to slap the oil in with a broad leather strap; then to put the patient to some hard kind of work in the sunshine. [...] After resting [...] the patient should eat some good wholesome food, well seasoned with spices and mixed with vegetables, as turnip or mustard salad, with vinegar [and] resume his work again

Author Vanessa Jackson has noted that lesions were a symptom of dysaesthesia aethiopica and "the ever-resourceful Dr. Cartwright determined that whipping could ... cure this disorder. Of course, one wonders if the whipping were not the cause of the 'lesions' that confirmed the diagnosis."

According to Cartwright, after the prescribed "course of treatment" the slave will "look grateful and thankful to the white man whose compulsory power ... has restored his sensation and dispelled the mist that clouded his intellect."

Cartwright saw the whole thing as confirmation of his belief that black people were incapable of looking after themselves without the supervision of white people. According to him, dysaesthesia aethiopica was "much more prevalent among free negroes living in clusters by themselves, than among slaves on our plantations, and attacks only such slaves as live like free negroes in regard to diet, drinks, exercise, etc." – indeed, according to Cartwright, "nearly all [free negroes] are more or less afflicted with it, that have not got some white person to direct and to take care of them." He explicitly dismissed the opinion which assigned the causes of the "problematic" behavior to the social situation of the slaves without further justifications: "[The northern physicians] ignorantly attribute the symptoms to the debasing influence of slavery on the mind."

== See also ==
- Drapetomania
- Scientific racism
- Minority stress
- Pellagra

== Sources ==
- Samuel A. Cartwright, "Report on the Diseases and Physical Peculiarities of the Negro Race", The New Orleans Medical and Surgical Journal 1851:691–715 (May).
  - Reprinted in DeBow's Review XI (1851). Available at Google Books and excerpted at PBS.org.
  - Reprinted in Arthur Caplan, H. Tristram Engelhardt, Jr., and James McCartney, eds, Concepts of Health and Disease in Medicine: Interdisciplinary Perspectives (Boston: Addison-Wesley, 1980).
  - Reprinted in Arthur L. Caplan, James J. McCartney, Dominic A. Sisti, eds, Health, Disease, and Illness: Concepts in Medicine (Washington, D.C.: Georgetown University Press, 2004) ISBN 1-58901-014-0.
