= Jean-Albert Dadas =

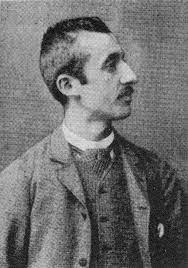
Photo of Jean-Albert Dadas

Jean-Albert Dadas (10 May 1860 – 28 November 1907), also known as the "Running Man" and "The First Fuguer", was a French gas fitter renowned for being one of the most notable cases of dromomania, a psychological condition characterized by an irresistible urge to wander with no discernible reason or recollection. Dadas, the presumed Patient Zero of the compelling wandering epidemic that swept through Europe, is a perplexing figure at the cusp of the nineteenth and twentieth centuries. Dadas gained prominence as the first documented case of "pathological tourism". His life was marked by an irresistible compulsion to wander and travel, embarking on extensive and often perilous journeys which captivated the public's attention. His condition is remarked and documented through the case study and treatment performed by the learned medical student, Philippe Tissié (1852–1935).

== Biography ==
Dadas was born on 10 May 1860 in Bordeaux, France to a family of gas workers. After enduring a head injury at the age of eight, Dadas experienced brain damage that is speculated to be the cause of his incessant wandering in his later years. Working in a gas company by the age of twelve, Dadas began to constantly wander without warning or understanding of why he was wandering or that he was even wandering at all. This is a condition known as dromomania, or an uncontrollable and inexplicable urge to wander or travel for long distances and long periods of time with no recollection of the journeys. Dadas would hear about a location and set out to travel there. These bouts weren't planned, but Dadas knew to garner a bit of money and some identification papers before traveling. However, he seemingly always lost them during his journey. Dadas wandered without identification papers and often without the ability to remember his own identity. Jean Albert-Dadas knew not who he was or why he wandered during bouts of Fugue, he only knew where his next destination would be. Often times, Dadas would be arrested or left with no money, forced to do small jobs such as scrubbing pots and farming in the places he'd traveled to and make it home using the money made from these ventures. Dadas traveled as far as Algeria, Spain, Bohemia and Austria. When awoken from his bouts of dromomania, Albert would act as if he was waking up from a deep slumber; incoherent, confused, and surprised at where he would find himself. Upon finding himself in unfamiliar places, Dadas would report to the French Consul or the nearest police station for aid where he would obtain just enough for a fourth class train ticket or permission to return home after retrieving identification papers. However, he would often hear of places during his train ride home and subsequently change his direction of travel to wherever his new destination was. Albert begged, toiled, and scrounged to fund his travels. Locals often provided him with bread and pennies to tide him over.

Jean-Albert Dadas would enlist in the 127th Infantry Regiment serving as a cook where he learned to read, but deserted shortly after with a childhood friend. According to Albert, his condition of constant fugue ultimately led to his arrest for nihilism in Moscow during the great sweep and panic following the assassination of the Russian Czar on the 13th of March in 1887, though it is debated to be a false recollection and simply a product of Albert's imagination. Albert's arrest and subsequent return to his regiment found him guilty of desertion and landed him the punishment of hard penal labor for three years, though he spent most of his sentence in the hospital for pain and was released early due to good conduct and an ear injury.

Dadas is described by Phillipe Tissie as a timid and shy man, but a talented and reliable worker when he is in his "awake" state and not traveling endlessly. Dadas never drank, even during his instances of fugue, and never engaged in sexual promiscuity, as he was chaste. Despite this, Tissie regards Dadas as an "inveterate masturbator". Dadas' everyday life and routine was not particularly notable or eventful, but the days leading up to one of his travels were filled with agony. Plagued by days of non-stop headaches, excessive sweating, insomnia, heightened anxiety, and an unrestrained amount of masturbation in the night, Dadas would endure days of pain and discomfort and then immediately set out for the next destination. He caused very little trouble during his travels in his state of fugue, and he remained clean, well-mannered, and presentable. Dadas hated his condition and, as Tissie regards it, his "imperious need to travel". Dadas believed his fugue was preventing him from leading a normal life, yet felt a sort of whimsy from traveling to places he had heard of as a child.

When Dadas would wake from his dromomania, while he often had a general sense of where he was, he would have no idea how he got to his latest destination, and could not recall any events that had taken place during his journey. Through the method of hypnosis, however, Dadas was able to regain some of his memories and recall the happenings of his journeys. At the age of twenty-six, Jean Albert-Dadas was admitted to a Dr. Albert Pitres' ward in the hospital of Saint-André after a long journey, weeping and exhausted. In 1886 in Pitres' ward, Dadas met Phillipe Tissie, a learned medical student and the man who would go on to study his condition and administer his treatment.

Jean Albert-Dadas' condition did not impair his ability to build relationships with the people around him, only his ability to maintain them. Upon returning from another bout of fugue, Dadas fell in love and became engaged to be wed. However, this engagement was called off when Dadas once again vanished on 18 June 1885, deserting his fiancee for three months before returning to her in September. Dadas' fiancee refused to speak to him again after his desertion. Through a second, quicker courtship, Dadas married a different woman, hoping that betrothal would keep him stationary. Despite his hopes, Dadas would steal money from his new wife and leave for another trip immediately after his wedding. His wife, jaded with wondering where Dadas was, began to seek satisfaction from other men, eventually marrying again before Dadas returned, much to his surprise. Dadas did eventually marry a second time and have a daughter named Marguerite-Gabrielle. However, after his wife's death due to tuberculosis, Dadas' daughter had to be adopted as his condition made him unable to be a reliable father for Marguerite. He frequently visited his daughter in between his travels. At the age of fifteen, his daughter would be trafficked into prostitution. At this time, Dadas would also pass away.

== Early life ==
Jean-Albert Dadas was born to parents Marie Dumeur and Romain Dadas and three siblings; two brothers and a sister. Born to a family of gas workers, Dadas was born to a hypochondriac father predisposed to gambling and squandering money as well as sexual promiscuity. One of his brothers managed a gas factory in the Midi and died of meningitis at the age of thirty-five. The second also suffered from hypochondria and headaches and worked in town, eventually dying in 1892. Dadas' sister was married to another gas worker. Dadas would join this family business at the age of twelve, around where his bouts of dromomania began. Dadas' mother died from pneumonia at age fifty in 1877 and his father died at the age of sixty-one from swelling of the brain in 1881. Dadas sentimentally and devotedly honored his mother after her death.

At the age of eight, Jean-Albert Dadas fell from a tree and injured his head, leading to subsequent uncontrollable vomiting, a concussion, and migraines. It is speculated that this injury to his undeveloped brain is the cause of Dadas' uncontrollable wandering and inability to conceptualize his inherent want to wander in his later years. These symptoms disappeared within the year, but Dadas gained severe nerve pain in the mouth shortly thereafter which was not aided by removal of teeth, hinting at possible neurological damage, though this is debated.

At the age of twelve, upon entering his position at the gas company, Dadas mysteriously disappeared. He was found soon thereafter by his brother helping a traveling umbrella salesman. When confronted, Dadas awoke from a sleep-like, disoriented state and could not recall why he left. This would be the first of countless instances of fugue for Dadas.

== Dromomania ==
Dromomania is a historical term coined by Philippe Tissie that refers to a nervous disposition characterized by a compulsive drive to take flight. This condition, also known as "wanderlust" and "fugue", is associated with an uncontrollable psychological urge to wander or travel. The symptoms of this condition may include behavior such as spontaneously departing from one's routine, traveling long distances, changing identities and occupations, and staying abroad for months at a time without returning to one's former identity. Dromomaniacs were characterized by mood swings, bouts of extreme depression, and a longing to leave one's current state or dwelling. Those afflicted with this condition abandoned friends, family, jobs, and entire livelihoods for no reason other than pointless travel.

The medical reports of Jean Albert-Dadas' disposition to desertion catalyzed an epidemic of fugue and "mad voyagers" in Bordeaux. This epidemic spread to Paris, France, Italy, and Germany with many medical disquisitions being written about the spike in cases in these areas.

Dromomania emerged during the late 19th century and the early 20th century as a new diagnosis from medical research and discussions on nervous dispositions and disorders. The condition was mostly restricted to Europe, as dromomania was not a common occurrence outside of the region. The term dromomania covered a range of individuals, including those with hysterical and epileptic fugues, as well as people who did not fit either label and were considered neurasthenic. It became an umbrella term for impulsive fugue and was associated with the larger concept of degeneracy or vagrancy.

== Dadas' travels ==
Jean Albert-Dadas first set out on his countless journeys at the age of twelve while he working as an apprentice to M. L. at a gas equipment manufacturing company in Bordeaux, France. Without notice, Dadas picked up and left town toward Arcachon and began apprenticing with a traveling umbrella salesman before being found by his brother and awoken from his trance-like state. Only a month after his first instance of fugue, Albert once again picked up and traveled to Valence d'Agen after simply hearing about the location from his father and was sent home by a family friend shortly thereafter.

During his employment at the gas company, Albert's employer, M. L. sent the young boy and one of his peers to retrieve coke for the gas company with 100 francs to purchase it. Unexpectedly, Jean Albert-Dadas found himself awaking on a train traveling to Paris and was found sleeping on a bench at the Orleans station in Paris and directed towards the police station to get back home. However, Albert was held in Mazas for two weeks before his information was obtained from his hometown and he was released to return to his family on foot, as they refused to pay his fare and chose, instead, to pay Albert's employer the 100 francs back. Instead of returning home, however, Albert worked as a house servant to M. Michel B at Lagroue in Marsac for at a pay rate of 50 francs per day. Only after two months did Albert return home with a sum of 50 francs saved up.

Shortly after switching gas companies to one owned by his family and working for a few months, Dadas' bouts of fugue led him to travel to Barbezieux where he would once again be arrested for not carrying his identification papers with him. This would be just the beginning of his many arrests for his lack of papers and vagrancy. These bouts of fugue and subsequent imprisonments brought Albert great shame, and he was constantly reluctant in returning home to his family. Albert would go on to journey mindlessly, reside at a commune, work, and find himself under arrest shortly after in locations such as Aix, Châtellerault, Vitry-le-Francois, and the Place de la Perrache. All instances would end with Albert being sent identification papers to the institution in which he was held, and he was sent on his way back to Bordeaux or Paris on foot, taking a great toll on his physical strength and stamina.

Dadas' travels were by no means delegated only within Europe. After another bout of fugue, Albert's father sent him ten francs and a letter of recommendation to work in the Tarbes arsenal. After one day finding himself in Bagnères-de-Biogorre, Albert set off to return to Tarbes and Toulouse and then to Cette and Marseille thereafter. Coincidentally, there was much talk of Africa once he arrived in Marseille. Dadas decided then to travel there and was off to Algeria right the next day. However, Dadas found no luck in terms of work and livelihood in Africa, traveling between Algiers, Blidah, and the like scrounging for food and lodging. Eventually, Dadas was fed by a Zouave who advised him to return to France after seeing his state.

After being brought back to Bordeaux by his father after traveling to Labouheyre, Albert's family suggested that he enlist in the place of his brother had so that he could quench his thirst for travel. Initially declared unfit for service, Dadas would represent himself to the recruiting officer once more and would be enrolled into the 127th Infantry Regiment at Valenciennes on 22 April 1878. Albert was forced to take convalescent leave after instances of bedwetting and treatment; he would bring his childhood friend, Baptiste, back with him upon his return to the military. Separated on arrival, Dadas began to suffer extreme headaches before being implored to desert the regiment by his friend. Dadas left in an instant with all of his military gear in tow. The two traveled through multiple cities in Belgium with no employment opportunities in sight before starting to beg for goods and necessities and doing odd jobs. Hearing about an opportunity to travel to the East Indies in Holland, the two set out for Amsterdam. The pair trudged through an intense and violent winter. Albert, in his bout of fugue, craved movement and involuntarily left Baptiste behind in the cold winter. Baptiste would later die of exhaustion.

After Baptiste's death, Albert was once again relegated to his routine of traveling, finding work, losing his papers, and being arrested. During his time after his desertion, Dadas traveled through Germany in cities such as Dusseldorf, Coblenz, and Frankfurt, Albert was astonished upon waking from a fugue to find himself on a steamship to Budapest and went directly to the French consul to travel to Vienna to work before being returned to his regiment on the twenty-first of September in 1880. Albert was subject to kitchen work as well as hard labor for his desertion of the regiment and his lack of artillery and uniform, which he traded for new clothes and money. Continuing to battle with his need to wander, Albert would desert his regiment again, this time to travel as far as the Rhine, Kassel, and Friederichsdorf where he was fed and housed in a pension for young girls. Albert would once again begin working in a gas factory in Vienna during his "awakened" state before finding himself in Budweis. Frightened to return to his employer, Albert would take to the French Consulate, take up collection in Prague and Leipzig from students and the consul respectively, and travel to the poor town of Posen. Upon being advised to ask for aid from a man living in a castle and being invited inside by a stewardess after some travel, Dadas would be attacked by a ferocious dog. The lord of the manor would send Albert to the hospital and pay for his medical fees.

Following his bout of injury and his hospital visit, Albert took to Moscow to after being invited by some traveling Jews for work opportunities. Coincidentally, Albert arrived in Moscow shortly after the assassination of the Russian Czar. Resembling a known nihilist, Dadas was questioned and imprisoned by Russian authorities even after protests from Dadas concerning his fugue. Placed into prison with students and women, the only ways out of the facility were to be hanged, relocated to Siberia, or freed. Dadas was freed once he was recognized as a French citizen and was led to the Turkish border on foot with his hands tied behind his back; only to be freed when he was fed. Even upon arriving to the set destination, Dadas and others remained imprisoned where they were lightly fed and made to stay in isbas, or Russian huts. Weeks later, Albert and his fellow peers were freed and told to not return to Russia, otherwise they would risk being sent to Siberia.

Albert would continue to walk for long periods at a time following his nihilism accusal before happening upon a hostel in Constantinople where he was cleaned, clothed, shaved, and fed. Albert eventually returned to his gas company and was determined to work this time. The fugue cycle, however, continued when Dadas met a fellow deserter who spoke of the great aspects of Switzerland. Without hesitation, Albert took off for Klostenburg, then Colmar, and finally crossed into Switzerland thereafter. Feeling unfulfilled in the cities of Switzerland, Albert turned himself in for desertion and was sent to military prison where he endured interrogation, toil and hard labor once again, this time at the camp at Portes-de-Fer in Africa. Albert was often hospitalized for violent headaches and ear injuries for the majority of his sentence before being pardoned for good behavior and declared unfit for military service. Albert would then, once again, return to his family's gas company.

Albert eventually aimed to settle down and get married upon meeting a young French woman. The two set a wedding date and Albert became determined to curb his fugue and start a family. Instead of this, however, Albert disappeared on the 18th of June in 1885 and awoke in a hospital in Verdun in September. Dadas' fiancee had already planned to marry another, much to his dismay.

Albert was assigned a travel warrant in December 1885 to aid in his condition. On 16 January 1886 Dadas was admitted into the Saint-Andre Hospital in Professor Lande's ward. Lande wanted to observe Dadas further and moved him into Dr. Pitres' ward in February, but before they could assess him, Albert had already gone. Albert would go on to travel from place to place again before returning to Saint-Andre Hospital on the third of May 1886, where his assessment would commence.

== Case Study ==
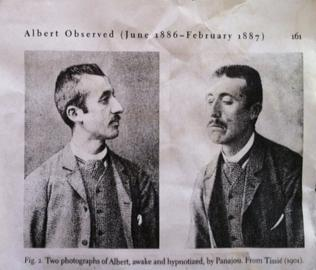
An image of Jean Albert-Dadas awake (left) and hypnotized (right)

=== Albert observed ===
Jean Albert-Dadas entered the Saint-André hospital in Bordeaux on the 16th of January in 1886. A month later, he was transferred to the ward of Albert Pitres, a neurological physician and professor, as he lectured about hypnotism and hysteria. During this time, one of Pitres' students, Philippe Tissie, began to observe Dadas more closely despite there being sixty patients assigned to Pitres' ward. Initially, it was believed that Dadas was suffering from epilepsy before being deemed a hysterical fuguer. Tissie kept track of Dadas through reports that would eventually be turned into a book of dreams published after Dadas' death in 1890. These reports depict Albert as the typical brain damage patient, remarking instances of amnesia, mood swings, and headaches. Despite these symptoms, Dadas was not subject to violent fits of rage like the typical male patient with brain damage. According to Tissie, Dadas only verbally lashed out at a coworker once during an instance of fugue. It is debated whether or not Dadas' injury as a child actually had an impact on his condition in his adult life, as his symptoms can align with a number of other conditions and his observers placed high scrutiny on possible brain damage, potentially swaying the case's results. It is not known what the exact cause of Albert's condition was.

=== Treatment and recollection ===
The method of hypnosis was regarded as an effective method for treating fuguers in the 19th century. Despite this, Jean Albert-Dadas was not treated through hypnosis until months after he admitted himself into Saint-André. Tissie first used hypnosis on Albert in December 1886, but had already facilitated Albert's recollection of his journeys a great deal before the method was utilized. It is not known exactly when hypnotic treatment began for Albert, as Tissie's timeline of events in earlier and later records do not align.

According to Tissie, Albert could recall every memory he lost in fugue and recite it through the hypnotic method. One such instance, told by Tissie, states that Albert came to him in a bout of fugue and was put under hypnosis. In this "asleep" state, Albert remarks that he is awake and conscious and begins to describe his wife's appearance and her last location and actions before Albert's state changed to fugue. Then, Albert is able to recount his actions and other happenings during his wandering state such as hearing a man rationalize uxoricide to him. This caused Albert to speak ill of his wife and threaten her in his hypnosis, however his feelings toward his wife turned favorable once the treatment ended.

In states of hypnosis, Dadas was made to perform actions that he likely would not have done in his everyday life such as riding a bike with companions and other unorthodox experiments. One of these experiments entailed Albert being observed to determine his reaction to vice and virtue. While hypnotized, Albert was told that his left knee represented virtue, and the right represented vice. Pressure on the right knee caused Albert to perform subjectively morally unethical actions such as stealing from someone. When the left knee experienced pressure, he would return the items in a subjectively morally ethical viewpoint. When both knees were pressed, Albert would become confused and perform a sort of middle-ground response such as taking money out of a wallet and then returning said wallet.

Tissie assimilated Albert to multiplicity; the concept of having more than one consciousness, an idea proposed by Eugene Azam, a French surgeon and psychologist. Azam remarked that Albert had a "first" and "second" consciousness. The first being Albert in his normal, everyday "awake" state, and the second being his state of fugue. Azam found that Albert's state of fugue appeared more intelligent. This aligning of Albert's fugue to a case of double consciousness allowed for him to be directly compared with cases of multiplicity.

== Broader impact ==
Jean Albert-Dadas' case and medical records caused a spike in cases of dromomania, focusing mainly in Europe in the 1890s, though this epidemic would only last for 25 years after Albert's case. This sudden traveling craze began in Bordeaux, France, and soon spread to other European countries such as Germany and Russia. This uptick in cases of dromomania allowed the mysterious condition to be studied more critically and with scrutiny, allowing fugue to become a neurological disorder in its own right. Though fugue and dromomania never made it to the United States or elsewhere, its impact remains prevalent through past medical studies and pop culture and media. The movie entitled "Forrest Gump", adapted from the book of the same name, takes inspiration from and references Jean Albert-Dadas, though not directly stated in the media. Robert Zemeckis, the director of the film, took Jean Albert-Dadas as one of his inspirations and references for the main character. In the tale, Forrest Gump, an also mentally impaired man, lives through events similar to that of Dadas such as enlisting in the military, traveling frequently, and rarely staying stationary for long periods of time. There is a point in Gump's life in which he decides to run for three years, two months, fourteen days, and sixteen hours without stopping and without reason, all while garnering a large crowd of people who take up and follow suit after him, reflecting the growing epidemic of dromomania and fugue in Europe after Dadas' reports were made available to the public.

== See also ==
- Jan E. Goldstein's "Console and Classify: The French Psychiatric Profession in the Nineteenth Century" (1989)
- Ian Dowbiggin's "Inheriting Madness: Professionalization and Psychiatric Knowledge in Nineteenth Century France" (1991)
- Kenneth White's "Les Affinités extrêmes" (2017)
- Aminatta Forna's "Ein Lied aus der Vergangenheit" (2012)
