= Frank F. Ledford Jr. =

Surgeon General of the US Army

Frank Finley Ledford Jr.
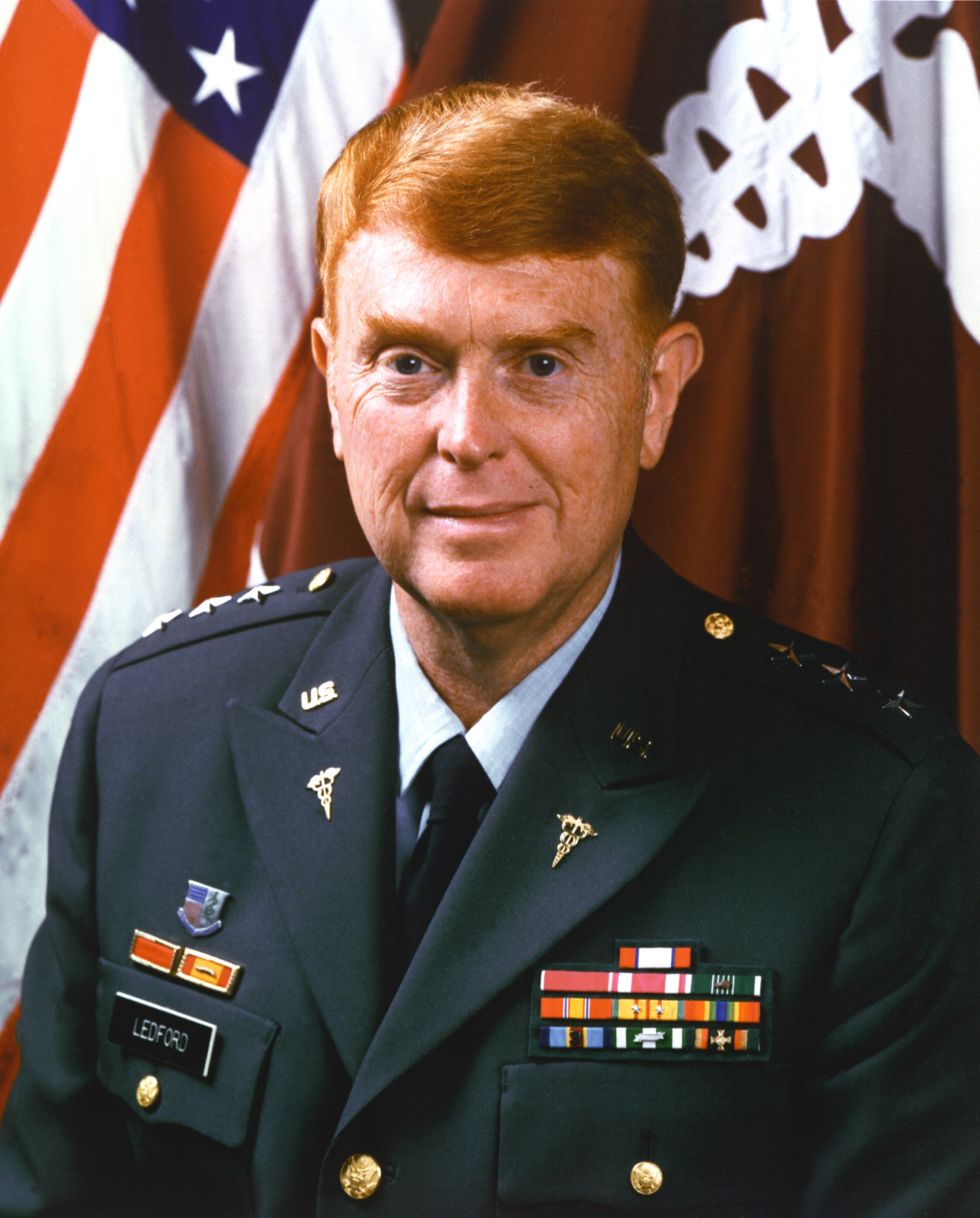
- Born: April 22, 1934; Jacksonville, Florida, U.S.
- Died: May 15, 2019 (aged 85); San Antonio, Texas, U.S.
- Military career
- Allegiance: United States of America
- Branch: United States Army
- Service years: 1958–1992
- Rank: Lieutenant General
- Commands: 7th Medical Command

Frank Finley Ledford Jr. (April 22, 1934 – May 15, 2019) was an American orthopedic surgeon who served as the 37th Surgeon General of the United States Army from 1988 to 1992.

== Biography ==
=== Background and education ===
He was born in April 1934 in Jacksonville, Florida. He attended college at the University of Dayton and received his bachelor's degree in 1955. That university later awarded him the Distinguished Alumni Award for his becoming the army surgeon general. In 1959, he received an M.D. degree from the University of Cincinnati College of Medicine. Later he did residency training in orthopedic surgery. Ledford was board certified by the American Board of Orthopedic Surgery. He is also a Fellow of the American College of Surgeons.

=== Service in the United States Army ===
Ledford has held positions as a Clinical Professor at the Uniformed Services University of the Health Sciences (USUHS), the medical school operated by the armed forces and at the University of Texas Health Science Center at San Antonio.

Culminating a long career in the U.S. Army Medical Corps, he was appointed the Surgeon General of the United States Army from June 16, 1988, to June 18, 1992. At the time, he had attained the rank of lieutenant general.

His tenure as Surgeon General came at the time of the Gulf War, when Allied forces liberated the Kuwait after Iraq invaded the country in 1991. This period was marked by apprehension over the threat of Iraqi forces using its known stock of nerve gas and possible use of biological weapons against Allied forces. This period was also marked by the difficulties in organizing military medical assets to the Persion Gulf region, which led to calling of reservists in the United States. Many of these reservists, which were physicians with private practices, were forced to temporarily close their practices and perform what they thought were mundane duties, such as doing physical examinations in U.S. bases. The thought that they were needlessly called led to some physician reservists leaving the Army reserve.

Ledford was stationed at numerous Army posts including, but not limited to, Fort Belvoir, VA (near Washington, DC), Fort Sam Houston (San Antonio, TX), Walter Reed Army Medical Center (Washington, DC), Fort Riley, KS, and Landstuhl Regional Medical Center (Germany). He was hospital commander of Irwin Army Hospital (now Irwin Army Community Hospital) in Fort Riley, Kansas in 1979 following then Col. William Winkler.

=== Career after serving as Surgeon General ===
Later, Ledford retired from the Army. He was president of the Southwest Foundation for Biomedical Research (SFBR) in San Antonio, Texas until his retirement in May, 2005 after 13 years with the foundation. The SFBR is an independent medical research institution with close ties, but a separate administration, with the University of Texas Health Science Center at San Antonio. As such, he was a member of the board of the Texas Research Foundation and is pictured seated on the far right of the photo of the board. photo

Ledford died after a short illness on May 15, 2019.

== Awards and decorations ==
Army Distinguished Service Medal
Legion of Merit
Meritorious Service Medal
Army Commendation Medal with one Oak leaf cluster
Army Meritorious Unit Commendation
National Defense Service Medal
Vietnam Service Medal with 2 Service stars
Army Service Ribbon
Army Overseas Service Ribbon with bronze award numeral 3
Republic of Vietnam Gallantry Cross Unit Citation
Vietnam Campaign Medal

== Miscellany ==
- He enjoyed aviation and received his Commercial Pilot License late in his military career.
- Ledford was licensed to practice medicine in Ohio, but not in Texas.
- He has a daughter
- He was a donor to the Sunshine Cottage School for Deaf Children having given a donation in 2005.

== Support for Physician Assistants ==
Ledford has been a strong supporter of the physician assistant (PA) profession. He was a driving force behind Army PAs becoming commissioned officers, whereas they had originally been warrant officers. He also created the Lieutenant General Frank Ledford Award, annually recognizing the most outstanding post-graduate US Army PA who successfully completes a PhD or DSc program and engages in research. The recipients of the Award have included the following:

- 2011 - MAJ Jonathan Saxe
- 2012 - MAJ Colin Dunderdale, DSc, PA-C
- 2013 - MAJ D. Alan Nelson, MPAS, PhD
- 2014 - CPT Joseph T. Costello, DSc, PA-C
- 2015 - MAJ Benjamin K. Kocher, DSc, PA-C
- 2016 - MAJ Kurt Fossum, MPAS, DSc
- 2017 - LTC Matthew Douglas, DSc, PA-C
- 2018 - MAJ James Huang, DSc, PA-C
