= William Winkler =

United States Army general

William P. Winkler, Jr.
- Military career
- Allegiance: United States of America
- Branch: United States Army
- Rank: Major General

William P. Winkler, Jr. (born c. 1932) was a musician, physician, and retired U.S. Army general. He was formerly executive director of the Kentucky Opera.

Winkler received his M.D. degree from the University of Illinois College of Medicine. He became a diplomate of the American Board of Obstetrics and Gynecology in 1967.

== Career ==
He served two tours of duty at the Pentagon and seven years in Europe, much of the time in Landstuhl Regional Medical Center in Germany. He served as hospital commander of Irwin Army Hospital (now Irwin Army Community Hospital) in Fort Riley, Kansas, USA until 1978. He was Deputy Assistant Secretary of Defense for Health Affairs. He retired at the rank of Major General.

Winkler was working for Humana in Louisville, Kentucky until the mid-1990's. In 1997, he became the executive director of the Kentucky Opera. He was replaced by Deborah Sandler, previous of the Opera Festival of New Jersey.

== Personal life ==
He was married to Diana and has five children, Martha, William, Sarah, Kurt, and Anna. He died May 22, 2020.
