= Philippe Tissié =

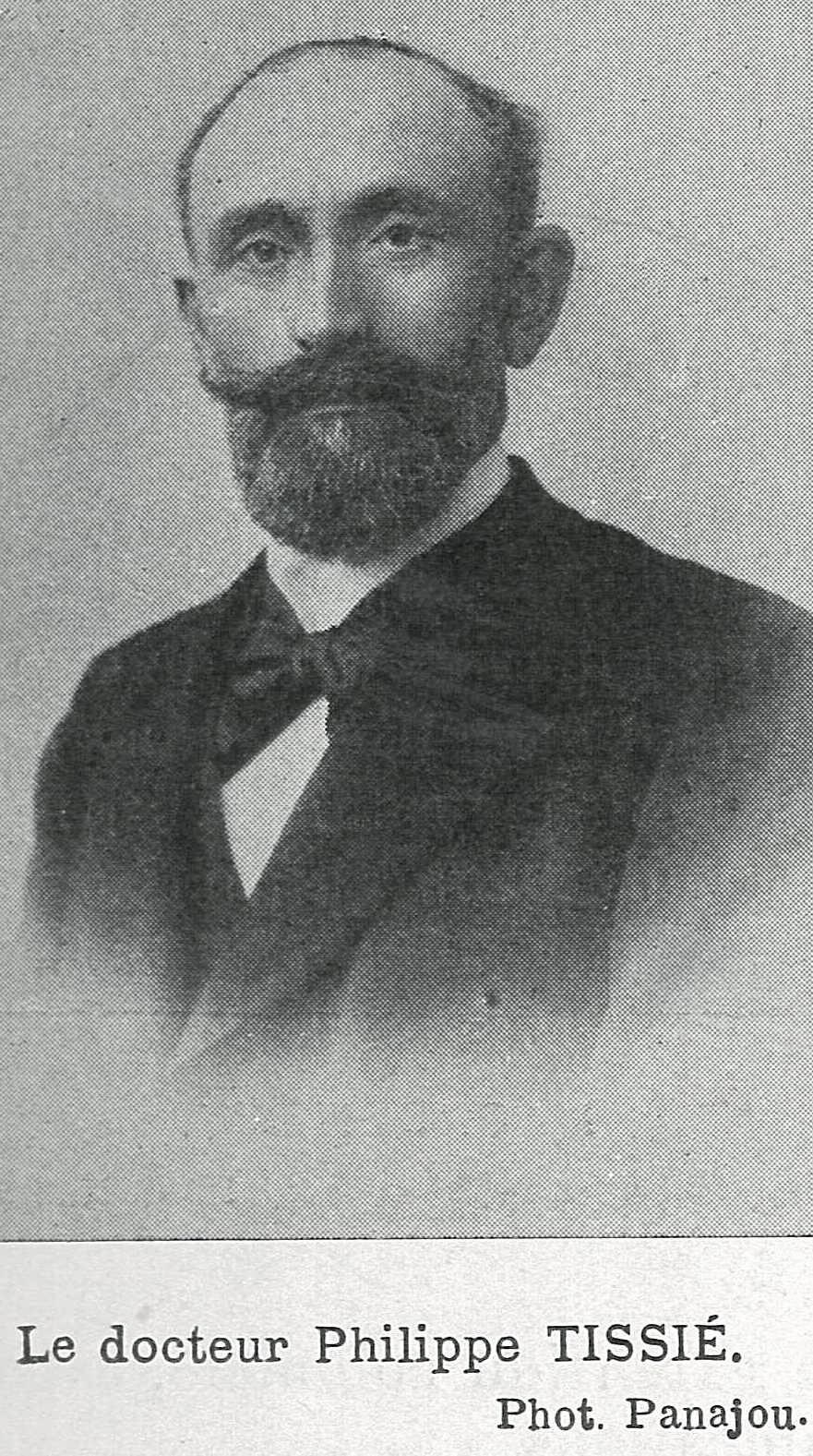
- Born: Philippe Auguste Tissié; 18 October 1852; La Bastide-sur-l'Hers
- Died: 4 June 1935 (aged 82); Pau
- Occupation: Physician
- Known for: Dromomania; Physical education

Philippe Auguste Tissié (1852–1935) was one of the first neuropsychiatrists in France. Together with Pierre de Coubertin and Paschal Grousset, he was the founder of French physical education, developing the schooling system to include sports and games. He was awarded the Legion of Honor in 1932.

== Early life and medicine ==
Philippe Auguste Tissié was born to a Protestant family in La Bastide-sur-l'Hers in the Ariège department in southwestern France. Orphaned, he had to work from an early age. After several menial jobs, he became deputy librarian at a faculty of medicine. As a late student of medicine, he presented his thesis called Les aliénés voyageurs : essai médico-psychologique (Traveling Madmen: A Medico-Psychological Paper) on 16 February 1887, examining the case of Jean-Albert Dadas and popularizing dromomania. The thesis was made under the mentorship of Albert Pitres, himself a disciple of Jean-Martin Charcot.

His experience from the medicinal association of Pau, his own "psycho-dynamic" clinic, a kindergarten, and a Protestant orphanage in Saverdun, led him to classify human beings into three groups: the passives, the affectives, and the affirmatives. He believed Swedish gymnastics could be applied for various treatments. He believed all his life that the brain and lungs had priority over any other aspect of physical education.

== Physical education ==
As a cyclist and the physician of the Véloce-club Bordelais and a member of the La Bastidienne gymnastics association founded by Charles Cazalet, he had views that were independent from either Paschal Grousset or Pierre de Coubertin: his opinions went against the sensibilities of the Left and, as a hygienist, he opposed the idea of competition, its violence, and the notion of sport promoted by the "Comité de propagande des exercices physiques". But he also became disillusioned with the traditional gymnastics he knew at La Bastidienne: Man was created to live on earth and not in the trees. On 19 December 1888, he created "La Ligue girondine d'éducation physique" (Girondin League of Physical Education) to promote traditional open-air games. His first school sports event (lendit) took place on 12 May 1890. He also founded La revue des jeux scolaires (School Games Magazine).

When he went on a mission in Sweden in 1898, he discovered Swedish gymnastics and became their unconditional supporter. The preacher of traditional open-air games became a disciple of Pehr Henrik Ling without renouncing his past: from that point on, his physical education combined Swedish gymnastics with applied gymnastics from sport games. Living in Pau from 1903, he worked on the propagation of his system, but his criticism of other French gymnastic practices resulted in his removal from inspection duties and a ban of his lendits by the ministry in 1907.

Grousset died in 1909. A year later, Tissié became the leader of the French League of Physical Education. In 1927, he founded the "Institut régional d'éducation physique" (Regional Institute of Physical Education) of Bordeaux within the local faculty of medicine, followed by eleven more institutes in the following year. Tissié conceived the "youth days", which were implemented by the French secretariat for physical education in 1932. He was present at the first new lendit in 1934. He died the following year.
