= Drapetomania =

Pseudoscientific mental disorder

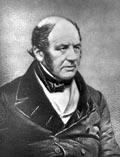
Samuel A. Cartwright, who created the concept

Drapetomania is a pseudoscientific mental disorder proposed in 1851 by American physician Samuel A. Cartwright as the cause of enslaved Americans choosing to escape enslavement. Deriving its name from the Greek δραπέτης (drapetēs, 'a runaway [slave]') and μανία (mania, 'madness, frenzy'), Cartwright's hypothesis was based on the belief that slavery was such an improvement upon the lives of slaves that only those suffering from some form of mental illness would wish to escape.

Cartwright specifically cited the tendency of slaves to flee their enslavers. Since slaves happy with their condition would not want to leave, he inferred that such people had to be sick, impervious to the natural order of things. He published an article about black slaves' illnesses and idiosyncrasies in De Bow's Review. Contemporarily reprinted in the South, Cartwright's article was widely mocked and satirized in the northern United States. The concept has since been debunked as pseudoscience and shown to be part of the edifice of scientific racism. As late as 1914, the third edition of Thomas Lathrop Stedman's Practical Medical Dictionary included an entry for drapetomania, defined as "vagabondage, dromomania; an uncontrollable or insane impulsion to wander."

== Description ==
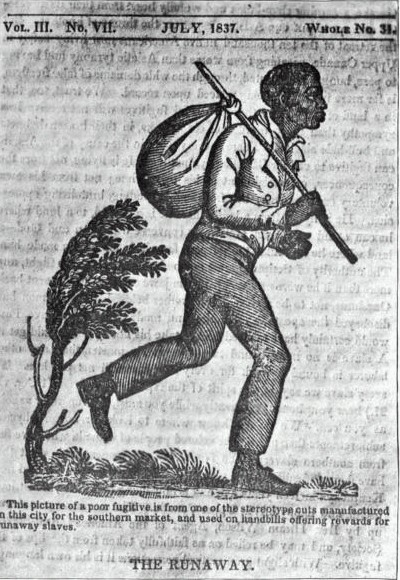
Engraving of an escaped slave, published in 1837

Cartwright described the disorder—which, he said, was "unknown to our medical authorities, although its diagnostic symptom, the absconding from service, is well known to our planters and overseers"—in a paper delivered before the Medical Association of Louisiana that was widely reprinted.

He stated that the malady was a consequence of masters who "made themselves too familiar with [slaves], treating them as equals".

If treated kindly, well fed and clothed, with fuel enough to keep a small fire burning all night—separated into families, each family having its own house—not permitted to run about at night to visit their neighbors, to receive visits or use intoxicating liquors, and not overworked or exposed too much to the weather, they are very easily governed—more so than any other people in the world. If any one or more of them, at any time, are inclined to raise their heads to a level with their master or overseer, humanity and their own good requires that they should be punished until they fall into that submissive state which was intended for them to occupy. They have only to be kept in that state, and treated like children to prevent and cure them from running away.

In Diseases and Peculiarities of the Negro Race, Cartwright says that the Bible calls for a slave to be submissive to his master, and by doing so, the slave will have no desire to run away:

If the white man attempts to oppose the Deity's will, by trying to make the negro anything else than "the submissive knee-bender" (which the Almighty declared he should be), by trying to raise him to a level with himself, or by putting himself on an equality with the negro; or if he abuses the power which God has given him over his fellow-man, by being cruel to him, or punishing him in anger, or by neglecting to protect him from the wanton abuses of his fellow-servants and all others, or by denying him the usual comforts and necessaries of life, the negro will run away; but if he keeps him in the position that we learn from the Scriptures he was intended to occupy, that is, the position of submission; and if his master or overseer be kind and gracious in his bearing towards him, without condescension, and at the same time ministers to his physical wants, and protects him from abuses, the negro is spell-bound, and cannot run away.

=== Prevention and remedy ===
In addition to identifying drapetomania, his feeling was that with "proper medical advice, strictly followed, this troublesome practice that many Negroes have of running away can be almost entirely prevented". In the case of slaves "sulky and dissatisfied without cause"—a warning sign of imminent flight—Cartwright mentioned "whipping the devil out of them" as a "preventative measure".

=== Contemporaneous criticism ===
While Cartwright's article was reprinted in the South, in the northern United States it was widely mocked. A satirical analysis of the article appeared in a Buffalo Medical Journal editorial in 1855. Renowned landscape architect Frederick Law Olmsted, in A Journey in the Seaboard Slave States (1856), observed that white indentured servants had often been known to flee as well, so he satirically hypothesized that the supposed disease was actually of white European origin, and had been introduced to Africa by traders.

Stephen Jay Gould identified Cartwright as "a prominent Southern physician" with the caveat that Cartwright's defenses of slavery constituted "an extreme within the range of 'scientific argument'" that was not typical and may have been unsupported by "many intelligent Southerners."

== See also ==
- Dysaesthesia aethiopica, another novel diagnosis of Cartwright regarding what was seen as a mental illness that was the cause of laziness among slaves.
- The Protest Psychosis: How Schizophrenia Became a Black Disease
- Depression
- Dromomania
- Political abuse of psychiatry
- Fugitive slave
- Classification of mental disorders
- Sluggish schizophrenia
- Biology of depression
- Gaslighting

== Sources ==
- Samuel A. Cartwright, "Report on the Diseases and Physical Peculiarities of the Negro Race", The New Orleans Medical and Surgical Journal 1851:691–715 (May).
  - Reprinted in DeBow's Review XI (1851). Available at Google Books and excerpted at PBS.org.
  - Reprinted in Arthur Caplan, H. Tristram Engelhardt, Jr., and James McCartney, eds, Concepts of Health and Disease in Medicine: Interdisciplinary Perspectives (Boston: Addison-Wesley, 1980).
  - Reprinted in Arthur L. Caplan, James J. McCartney, Dominic A. Sisti, eds, Health, Disease, and Illness: Concepts in Medicine (Washington, D.C.: Georgetown University Press, 2004) ISBN 1-58901-014-0

== Bibliography ==
- Katherine Bankole, Slavery and Medicine: Enslavement and Medical Practices in Antebellum Louisiana, New York: Taylor and Francis Group, 1998.
- Bob Myers, "Drapetomania": Rebellion, Defiance and Free Black Insanity in the Antebellum United States, phD thesis, 2014.
