= John Ezell =

American scenic designer and theatre educator

- Born: 1931 (age 94–95); St. Louis, Missouri
- Education: Washington University in St. Louis (BFA); Yale University (MFA)

John Ezell (born 1931) is an American scenic designer and theatre educator. He currently serves as the Hall Family Foundation Professor of Design at the University of Missouri-Kansas City, where he leads the UMKC Theatre Scenic Design program.

== Early life ==
Ezell was born and raised in St. Louis, Missouri. He earned his Bachelor of Fine Arts in Painting from St. Louis School of Fine Arts at Washington University (known today as the Sam Fox School) in 1954. Following a period of service in the armed forces, Ezell was accepted to study theatrical design at the Yale School of Drama under the tutelage of American scenic designer Donald Oenslager, where he graduated with his Master of Fine Arts in Drama in 1960. Ezell served as Head of Scenic Design at the University of Wisconsin-Madison Department of Theatre from between 1964 and 1986. He began teaching at the University of Missouri-Kansas City in 1986, and currently serves as Head of its M.F.A. degree program in Scenic Design.

== Career ==
Ezell's design career spans over five decades of work in the professional theatre and includes over 350 productions. His credits include works produced on Broadway, at the New York Shakespeare Festival, the Crossroads Theatre, the Roundabout Theatre Company, the Shakespeare Theatre in Washington, D.C., the Hong Kong Repertory Theater, the Royal Danish Ballet in Copenhagen, the National Swedish Touring Theatre, and the Cullberg Ballet in Stockholm. Ezell's designs have also been featured in numerous regional theatre productions, including performances at the Repertory Theatre of St. Louis, the Kansas City Repertory Theatre (formerly the Missouri Repertory Theatre), the Arizona Theatre Company, Chicago's Second City, the Great Lakes Theatre Festival, the Milwaukee Repertory Theater, and the Cincinnati Playhouse. The retrospective exhibition Bold Strokes and Finesse; the Stage Designs of John Ezell, based upon his work, has been on show in museums and galleries across North America.

In 1994, Ezell adapted the charrette process, a system of artistic study utilized by the École des Beaux-Arts in Paris during the 19th-century, into a training process for theatrical design, a system that is now used by multiple schools. He serves as a consultant to Yale University's Beinecke Rare Book and Manuscript Library, and was invested in the College of Fellows of the American Theatre in 2004.

Ezell has been the recipient of numerous awards. His professional merits include eleven Critics' Circle Awards, an Award for Experimental Television Art at the International Non-Commercial Television Festival in Milan, and a Corporation for Public Broadcasting Award for Excellence. Ezell was recognized for his contributions to American theatre on the 75th Anniversary of the founding of the Yale School of Drama, and was the recipient of Washington University's Distinguished Alumni Award in 2001.
