= Samuel A. Cartwright =

American physician (1793–1863)

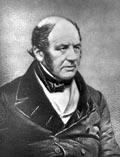
- Samuel Cartwright
- Born: Samuel Adolphus Cartwright; November 3, 1793; Fairfax County, Virginia
- Died: May 2, 1863 (aged 69); Jackson, Mississippi
- Education: University of Pennsylvania School of Medicine
- Occupation: Physician
- Known for: Coining "drapetomania"
- Spouse: Mary Wren

Samuel Adolphus Cartwright (November 3, 1793 – May 2, 1863) was an American medical doctor who practiced in Mississippi and Louisiana in the antebellum United States. Cartwright is best known for promoting the pseudoscientific concept of drapetomania, which falsely pathologized enslaved people's desire for freedom, and for publicly rejecting germ theory.

== Biography ==
Born 1793 on 20 November, he was the son of the Reverend John Slye Cartwright and Ann "Nancy" Trammell. Cartwright's mother came from a slave owning family in Loudoun County, Virginia.

Cartwright studied medicine under Benjamin Rush at the University of Pennsylvania. He would go on to practice medicine across the south and gained a reputation as having an expertise in cholera prevention.

Cartwright married Mary Wren of Natchez, Mississippi, in 1825. The Wren family enslaved African Americans, and Wren brought eight enslaved women into the marriage as property under the legal regime of slavery. Cartwright’s social status increased after joining the enslaving planter class, and he accumulated wealth through the cotton economy, which depended heavily on enslaved labor. Cartwright would, however, go bankrupt in 1837.

During the American Civil War, he was a physician in the Confederate States Army. He served in camps near Vicksburg and Port Hudson. He was assigned to improve the sanitary conditions for the soldiers.

== Slavery ==
The Medical Association of Louisiana tasked Cartwright with studying what white Southern physicians at the time described as "the diseases and physical peculiarities of the negro race". His report was delivered as a speech at its annual meeting on March 12, 1851, and published in its journal. The most notorious portions, on drapetomania and dysaesthesia aethiopica, were reprinted in DeBow's Review. He subsequently prepared an abbreviated version, with sources cited, for Southern Medical Reports.

Cartwright argued that enslaved people who resisted enslavement or attempted escape should be physically punished: "If they nonetheless became dissatisfied with their condition, they should be whipped to prevent them from running away." In describing his theory and cure for drapetomania, Cartwright invoked pro-slavery interpretations of Christian scripture to defend slavery and justify his theories.

Cartwright falsely promoted racist pseudoscientific claims that Black people had 10% smaller brains than those of white people, and that their respiratory and skeletal systems were structured differently.

Furthermore, Cartwright described the condition of 'genu fluxit', in which enslaved people were expected to display submission and deference toward enslavers. The condition could be lost, though, if enslavers treated enslaved people overly harshly and denied basic privileges. Rather than just arguing to treat enslaved people negatively overall, he advocated a paternalistic view that treated enslaved adults as inherently childlike and subordinate.

Cartwright also invented another purported 'disorder', dysaesthesia aethiopica, a disease "affecting both mind and body"; Cartwright used the theory to rationalize racist stereotypes portraying enslaved people as inherently lazy or disobedient. Dysaesthesia aethiopica, "called by overseers 'rascality'", was characterized by partial insensitivity of the skin and "so great a hebetude of the intellectual faculties, as to be like a person half asleep." Other symptoms included "lesions of the body discoverable to the medical observer, which are always present and sufficient to account for the symptoms."

Cartwright further claimed that dysaesthesia aethiopica was "much more prevalent among free negroes living in clusters by themselves, than among slaves on our plantations, and attacks only such slaves as live like free negroes in regard to diet, drinks, exercise, etc." — indeed, according to Cartwright, "nearly all [free negroes] are more or less afflicted with it, that have not got some white person to direct and to take care of them."

== Cultural depictions ==
- Cartwright was referenced in the 2004 film C.S.A.: The Confederate States of America. In the film, after the Confederate States of America wins the American Civil War, Cartwright's work forms the basis for the fictional Cartwright Institute for Freedom Illnesses, a medical school incorporating his theory on drapetomania and racist pseudoscientific theories about "negro peculiarities".
- Cartwright is also portrayed in the 1971 Mondo exploitation film Goodbye Uncle Tom alongside many other figures from the time. Notably, Cartwright is stated to be Jewish in the film, which he was not in reality.
- Cartwright is mentioned and appears, along with other historical personalities, in Season 7 of the series Outlander (TV series), based on the books by Diana Gabaldon.

== Publications ==
- Cartwright, M. D., S. A. (August 1851). "How to Save the Republic, and the Position of the South in the Union". DeBow's Journal. Vol. 11, no. 2. pp. 184–197.
- Cartwright, Dr. (July 1858). "Dr. Cartwright on the Caucasians and the Africans". DeBow's Review. Vol. 25, no. 1. pp. 45–56.
- Cartwright, Samuel A. (September 1859). "The Education, Labor, and Wealth of the South". DeBow's Review. Vol. 27, no. 3. pp. 263–279.
- Cartwright, Samuel A. (August 1860). "Unity of the Human Race Disproved by the Hebrew Bible". DeBow's Review. Vol. 4, no. 2. pp. 129–136.
- Cartwright, Samuel A. (1863). "An essay on the natural history of the prognathous race of mankind". The Dred Scott decision. Opinion of Chief Justice Taney, with an introduction by Dr. J.H. Van Evrie. Also, an appendix, containing an essay on the natural history of the prognathous race of mankind, originally written for the New York Day-book, by Dr. S. A. Cartwright, of New Orleans. New York: Van Evrie, Horton & Co. pp. 45–48.
