= Jonathan Metzl =

American psychiatrist and author

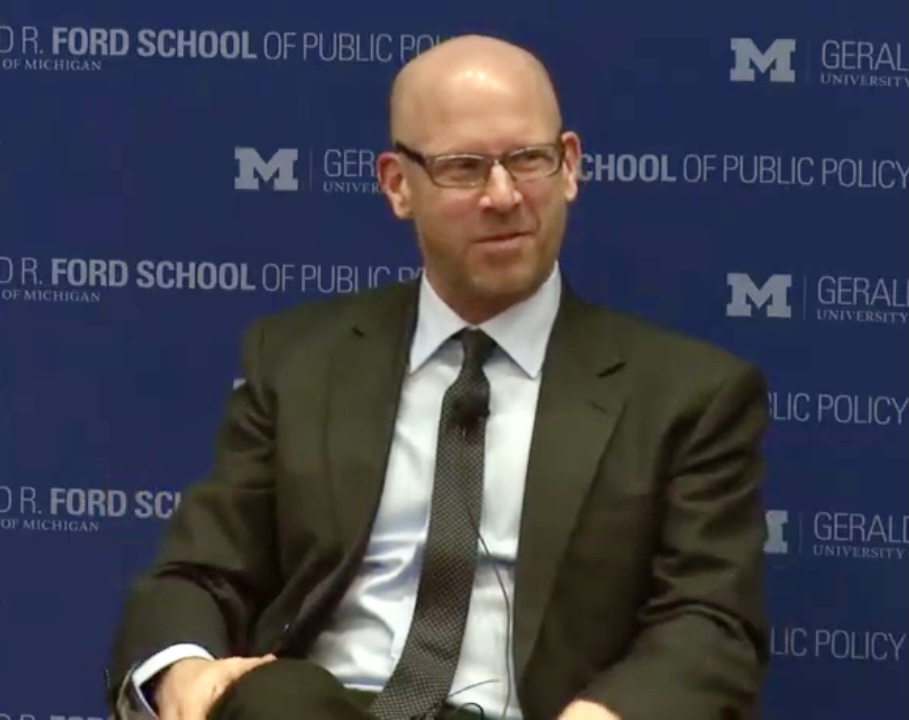
- Metzl in 2019
- Born: Jonathan Michel Metzl; December 12, 1964 (age 61); Kansas City, Missouri
- Education: University of Missouri, Kansas City; Stanford University; University of Michigan
- Awards: Guggenheim Fellowship (2006)
- Scientific career
- Fields: American studies Psychiatry; Sociology
- Workplaces: Vanderbilt University
- Thesis: The Freud of Prozac: Prescribing Gender in the Era of Wonder Drugs (2001)
- Doctoral advisor: Domna C. Stanton
- Website: www.jonathanmetzl.com

Jonathan Michel Metzl (born December 12, 1964) is an American psychiatrist and author. He is the Frederick B. Rentschler II Professor of Sociology and Psychiatry at Vanderbilt University, where he is also Director of the Center for Medicine, Health, and Society. Metzl is an expert on gun violence and mental illness, which is the subject of his latest book, What We've Become, Living and Dying in a Country of Arms. He is the author of several other books, including The Protest Psychosis, Prozac on the Couch, Against Health: How Health Became the New Morality, and Dying of Whiteness.

== Early life and education ==
Metzl was born and raised in Kansas City, Missouri to a Jewish family. His father was a pediatrician and his mother was a psychoanalyst. He has three brothers, Jordan, Jamie and Joshua, two of whom are doctors. He received two bachelor's degrees, one in biology and one in English literature, from the University of Missouri, Kansas City, where he went on to earn his M.D. He then completed his residency in psychiatry at Stanford University, where he also earned a master's degree in poetry. In 2001, while working as a psychiatrist, he earned a Ph.D. in American studies from the University of Michigan.

== Academic career ==
Metzl joined the faculty of the University of Michigan in 1998 as director of the Rackham Interdisciplinary Institute. He became an assistant professor in the Department of Psychiatry and Women's Studies Program there in 2001 and was named Director of their Program in Culture, Health, and Medicine in 2003. In 2006, he was awarded a Guggenheim Fellowship. In 2011, he became the Frederick B. Rentschler II Professor of Sociology and Psychiatry and director of the Center for Medicine, Health, and Society at Vanderbilt University.

== Views ==
Metzl has written of white identity in the United States being expressed through a vector of "shared resentments" rather than unifying values. He sees whiteness and white identity as increasingly prominent in Donald Trump's presidency.
