= J. Camille Hall =

American university chancellor

- Born: Gould, Arkansas

Academic background
- Education: New Mexico State University, Las Cruces BSW (1991), MSW (1993), Smith College (2004)
- Alma mater: Smith College
- Thesis: An exploratory study of the role of kinship ties in fostering resilience among African American adult children of alcoholics (2004)

J. Camille Hall is the former vice chancellor for diversity and inclusion at the University of Missouri, Kansas City. She was the inaugural Associate Dean for Equity and Inclusion and the first black female full professor in the College of Social Work at the University of Tennessee. Hall's research focuses on African American risk and resilience and multicultural education.

== Education and career ==
Hall grew up in rural Arkansas. She joined the United States Army in 1985, and she worked for the United States Army Reserve as a clinical social work officer with Irwin Army Community Hospital in Fort Riley, Kansas starting in 1990, and retired in November 2020.

Hall earned both her bachelor's in social work in 1991 and master's in social work in 1993 at New Mexico State University. She completed her Ph.D. in 2004 in social work with a specialization area of mixed-method research methodologies for the evaluation of risk and resilience among African Americans, clinical social work practice, and multicultural competence at Smith College. From 2000 until 2004, Hall was the program director for Bachelor's of Social Work program at Philander Smith College. Before joining academia, she was a social worker in different agencies in New Mexico

Hall became a faculty member at the University of Tennessee in 2004, and was promoted to professor in 2019, becoming the first black female with the rank of full professor in the College of Social Work. As of 2020, Hall is the first Associate Dean of Equity and Inclusion within the College of Social Work at the University of Tennessee. In 2022 she was named vice chancellor for diversity and inclusion at the University of Missouri Kansas City.

== Research ==
Hall is known for her work on African American risk, resilience, and multicultural education. She has examined the role of skin color stratification, 'colorism', in the mental health of Africa American women, and has examined workplace discrimination against African American women. Hall has also done research on adult children of alcoholics, which she talks about this book. Hall's 2007 book, African American behavior in the social environment: new perspectives, was reviewed by the British Journal of Social Work in 2008.

== Selected publications ==
- Hall, J. Camille (2018-11-17). "Black women talk about stereotypical transference enactments in cross-cultural supervision". Journal of Human Behavior in the Social Environment. 28 (8): 1019–1032. doi:10.1080/10911359.2018.1489930. ISSN 1091-1359. S2CID 149921537.
- Everett, Joyce E.; Camille Hall, J.; Hamilton-Mason, Johnnie (2010-02-01). "Everyday Conflict and Daily Stressors: Coping Responses of Black Women". Affilia. 25 (1): 30–42. doi:10.1177/0886109909354983. ISSN 0886-1099. S2CID 145185943.
- Hamilton-Mason, Johnnie; Hall, J. Camille; Everett, Joyce E. (2009-08-14). "And Some of Us Are Braver: Stress and Coping Among African American Women". Journal of Human Behavior in the Social Environment. 19 (5): 463–482. doi:10.1080/10911350902832142. ISSN 1091-1359. S2CID 145228769.
- Hall, J. Camille (2017-05-01). "No Longer Invisible: Understanding the Psychosocial Impact of Skin Color Stratification in the Lives of African American Women". Health & Social Work. 42 (2): 71–78. doi:10.1093/hsw/hlx001. ISSN 0360-7283. PMID 28339799.
- African American behavior in the social environment : new perspectives. J. Camille Hall, Stan L. Bowie. New York: Haworth Press. 2007. ISBN 978-0-7890-3324-6. OCLC 179101559.
