= Dying of Whiteness =

2019 non-fiction book

- Author: Jonathan M. Metzl
- Working title: Dying of Whiteness: How the Politics of Racial Resentment Is Killing America's Heartland
- Language: English
- Subject: Medical policy, Public health, Race relations, Political aspects, Race, ethnicity
- Genre: Non-fiction
- Set in: United States
- Published: New York
- Publisher: Basic Books
- Publication date: March 2019
- Publication place: United States
- Pages: 352
- ISBN: 9781541644984 1st edition
- OCLC: 1090877404
- Preceded by: The Protest Psychosis: How Schizophrenia Became a Black Disease
- Website: Official website

Dying of Whiteness: How the Politics of Racial Resentment Is Killing America's Heartland is a 2019 non-fiction book written by Jonathan M. Metzl, a professor of sociology and psychiatry at Vanderbilt University, based on research undertaken in Missouri, Tennessee and Kansas from 2013 to 2018.

== Overview ==
In his 2019 non-fiction book, which is based on several years of research undertaken in the 2010s in the South and Midwest states—Missouri, Tennessee and Kansas, physician and psychiatrist Jonathan Metzl reveals the unintended public health consequences of some right-wing backlash politics related to taxes, gun control, social safety nets, and healthcare on vulnerable white voters they had promised to help. Through "field interviews, research and public-health data" gathered over the years of travel to these states, Metzl found that some vulnerable white Americans would rather die than betray their political views that have become enmeshed with their own sense of white identity.

== Background ==
Jonathan Metzl, who is a physician and psychiatrist who grew up in Missouri, and earned his medical degree in Kansas City, described how this book emerged from a research study he undertook from 2013 to 2018 in the South and Midwest states, including Missouri, Kansas, and Tennessee. Metzl began his research to enhance understanding of the health implications of "backlash governance". His methods included field interviews with a wide range of everyday Americans, along with research and public-health data. They revealed that racial resentment among lower- and middle-class white Americans, who believe politicians can make their lives great again, led to the enactment of public policy changes related to gun control, the Affordable Care Act, severe cuts to social services and education in states such as Missouri, Tennessee and Kansas, that placed these voters at a heightened risk of death by suicide, gun violence, a decrease in life expectancy and an increase in school dropout rates. He calls on white Americans to reject the racial hierarchies that are leading America's demise.

Metzl, a Guggenheim fellow, a Nashville, Tennessee Vanderbilt University professor of sociology and psychiatry, who earned his PhD in American Culture from the University of Michigan, has also authored The Protest Psychosis: How Schizophrenia Became a Black Disease in 2014, Against Health: How Health Became the New Morality in 2010, and Prozac on the Couch: Prescribing Gender in the Era of Wonder Drugs in 2003.

== Critical reception ==
Esquire and The Boston Globe said it was one of the most anticipated books of 2019. The Globe said that this book goes deeper into examining how "segments of the American electorate support candidates and political ideas that run contrary to their own self-interest". Metzl, from the perspective of a "sociologist and psychiatrist...examines the ways policies of right-wing backlash (pro-gun laws, cuts to education, social services, and health care) affect the lives and life expectancies of these people."

The Star Tribune wrote, "As a physician and psychiatrist reared in the Midwest, Metzl has science and Heartland street cred on his side; as a public health instructor at Vanderbilt University School of Medicine, his clinical approach doesn't overshadow his skill as a wordsmith. As a result, Dying of Whiteness is a weighty but smooth read, devoid of polemics or jargon."

An April 27, 2019 book launch at the Politics and Prose bookstore in Northwest Washington, D.C., was briefly interrupted by a group of eight men and one woman, white nationalists, led by Patrick Casey, co-founder of the American Identity Movement (AIM) with a megaphone and a videographer. They formed a line at the front of the seated audience and chanted "AIM", before they were herded from the store by the staff. The entire disruption lasted about a minute. The audience booed them and then continued the discussion about the book. Politics and Prose sold all their copies of Dying of Whiteness. According to The Washington Post, the bookstore owner had trained staff to prepare for white nationalist protests, because there had been protests against a number of books staged at bookstores including their own since early 2019, but they had not anticipated that this book would attract their attention.

The New York Times included the book on its list of antiracist books to read.

== Media interviews ==
As a guest on HBO's Real Time with Bill Maher, Metzl said that the politics that claim to make America great again result in making working-class white lives harder, sicker, and shorter. Metzl said that he devoted seven years traveling through the South tracking what happens when you block healthcare reform for a decade while making huge tax cuts. From a medical and a data angle, these policies were as dangerous to people as asbestos, secondhand smoke and not wearing seatbelts and were contributing to a shortened life span. Other mainstream media outlets interviewed Metzl including The Brian Lehrer Show, in which he described how he along with colleagues interviewed people regarding the ACA. In this interview, Lehrer asked Metzl to describe more about Trevor, a participant in one of the focus groups. Trevor died from liver disease that would have been preventable if he had had access to health care. But until his dying breath, he agreed with the policies that prevented ACA improvements because he did not want his tax dollars to pay for Mexicans or "welfare queens".

== See also ==
- Heather McGhee
- Southern strategy
- Welfare chauvinism
