= Rita Blitt =

American artist and filmmaker (born 1931)

- Born: Rita Copaken; September 7, 1931 (age 94); Kansas City, Missouri, U.S.
- Education: University of Missouri–Kansas City
- Occupation: Artist
- Movement: Expressionism, Post-Impressionism, Surrealism, Abstract Expressionism, Minimalism
- Spouse: Irwin Blitt (m. 1951–2017)
- Website: ritablitt.com

Rita Blitt (born Rita Copaken, September 7, 1931) is an American painter, sculptor and filmmaker.

== Biography ==
Rita Blitt is an American contemporary painter, sculptor and film collaborator. Born Rita Lea Copaken in Kansas City Missouri on September 7, 1931, to Dorothy Sofnas Copaken and Herman Copaken, Blitt was married for 66 years to Irwin Blitt, 1928-2017. Blitt attended the University of Illinois and received a degree in Fine Arts in 1952 from the University of Missouri at Kansas City. After her bachelor’s degree, Blitt continued her art studies at the Kansas City Art Institute with painter Wilbur Niewald. In 2010 Blitt received the UMKC Spotlight Alumnus Award.

Blitt is known for her abstract organic lines and shapes inspired by nature, music and dance, such as her black line paintings and pastel "Oval" series. Blitt has used her drawings as inspiration for sculpture, the tallest being "One" standing at 60 feet in Overland Park, Kansas. Blitt has been involved in the making of several films about her art practice and artistic collaborations. "Caught in Paint", 2003, is a 6 minute film following the collaboration of Blitt, David Parsons, the Parsons Dance Company, and Lois Greenfield, dance photographer. The film received 16 awards and was shown at over 130 film festivals. Blitt is also known for her words, "Kindness is contagious. Catch it!", which have inspired kindness programs and awards including the Kindest Kansas Citian and the Kindest School.

Aspen has been a source of inspiration for Blitt. Her drawing was featured on the cover of the 2011 Aspen Music festival's program book. Also, she was honored by Aspen's Red Brick Art Center in 2012.

Blitt's paintings and sculpture have been featured in over 70 solo exhibitions in the United States, Israel and Singapore.

A five foot Blitt sculpture, "Sensuously Stacked Steel," placed fifth in the 2005 Florence Biennale.

The Omni award winning book "Rita Blitt: The Passionate Gesture", 2000, ISBN 0-9630785-8-5, documents selected Blitt drawings, paintings and sculpture from a period of twenty years.

The Rita Blitt Gallery and Sculpture Garden housing her legacy collection opened November 3, 2017 at The Mulvane Art Museum, Washburn University in Topeka, Kansas. In 2019, Washburn awarded Blitt an Honorary Doctoral Degree in Fine Arts.

== Museums ==
- Nelson-Atkins Museum of Art, Kansas City, MO
- Mulvane Art Museum, Rita Blitt Gallery and Sculpture Garden, Washburn University, Topeka, KS
- Kemper Museum of Contemporary Art, Kansas City, MO
- Nerman Museum of Contemporary Art, Overland Park, KS
- Nevada Museum of Art, Reno, NV
- Albrecht-Kemper Museum of Art, St. Joseph, MO
- John F. Kennedy Library, Boston, MA
- Spertus Museum, Chicago, IL
- Wonderscope Children's Museum, Kansas City, MO
- Kennedy Museum of American Art, Ohio University, Athens, OH
- National Museum, Singapore
- Spencer Museum of Art, University of Kansas, Lawrence, KS
- Skirball Cultural Center, Los Angeles, CA
- Marianna Kistler Beach Museum of Art, Manhattan, KS

== Awards and honours ==
- 2004: Berkeley Film Festival, Grand Festival Award: "Caught in Paint"
- 2005: Florence Biennale, Award in Sculpture: "Sensuously Stacked Steel"
- 2005: Boulder International Film Festival, Best Short Documentary: "Caught in Paint"

== Published works ==
- "Rita Blitt: Around and Round", Mulvane Art Museum/TRA Publications. ISBN 978-1-7322978-4-5
- "Rita Blitt: The Passionate Gesture", Willoughby Design, RAM/Brandeis Publications. ISBN 0-9630785-8-5
- "Rita Blitt, Reaching Out From Within", David Knaus, National Museum, Singapore. ISBN 9971-917-335

== Films ==
- 1976: "flag 1976"
- 1984: "dancing hands: Visual Arts of Rita Blitt"
- 2003: "Caught in Paint"
- 2005: "Caught in Nature"
- 2006: "Visual Rhythms"
- 2011: "Collaborating with the Past"
- 2013: "Abyss of Time"
