= De Bow's Review =

Widely -circulated 19th-century magazine

DeBow's Review
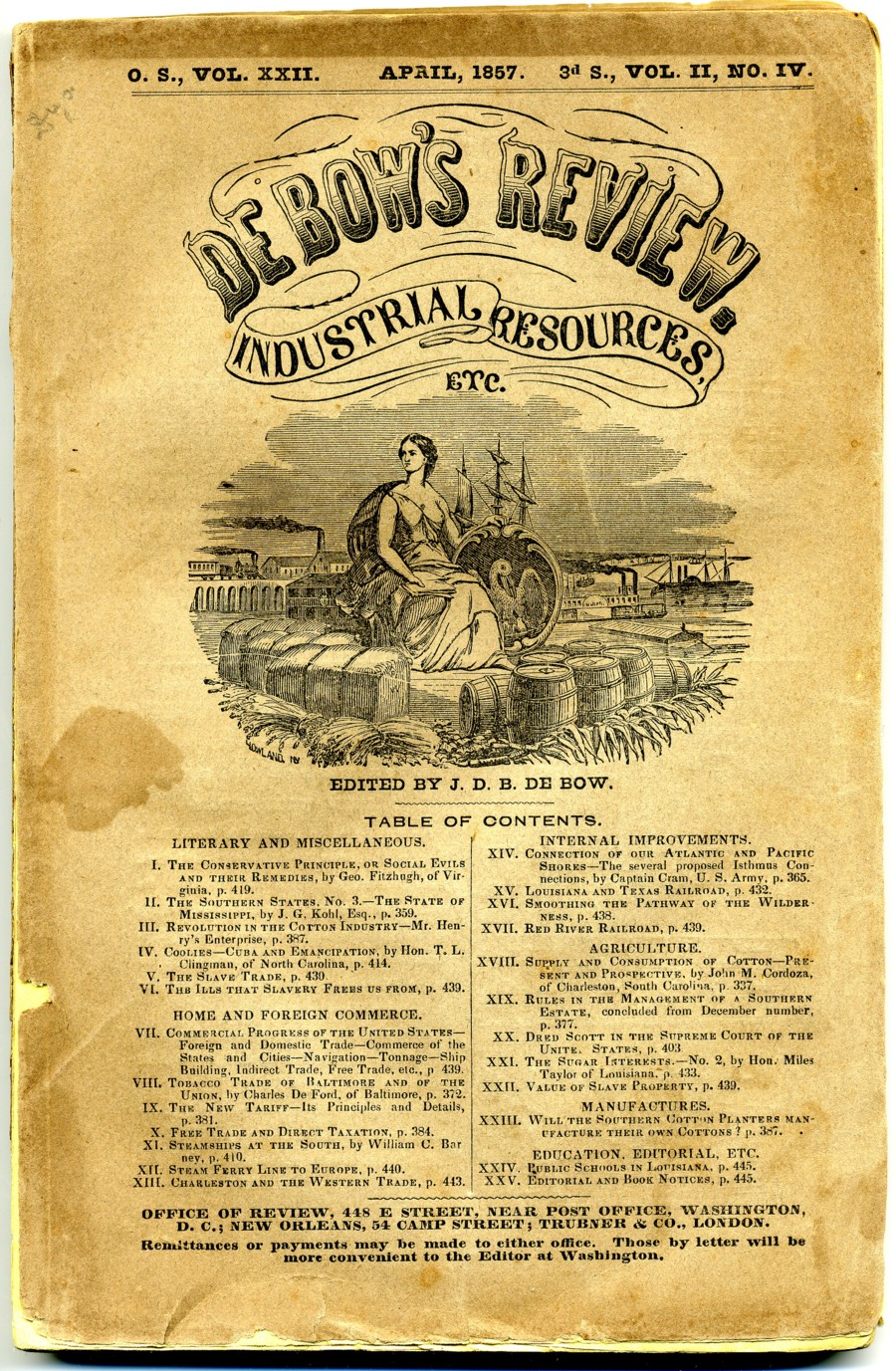
- Founder: J. D. B. De Bow
- Founded: 1846
- Ceased publication: 1884
- Language: English

De Bow's Review was a widely-circulated magazine of "agricultural, commercial, and industrial progress and resource" in the American South during the mid-19th century, from 1846 to 1884. Before the Civil War, the magazine "recommended the best practices for wringing profits from slaves." It bore the name of its first editor, James Dunwoody Brownson De Bow (J. D. B. De Bow, 1820–1867), who wrote much of the early issues, but there were various writers over the years (see below: Contributors). R. G. Barnwell and Edwin Q. Bell, of Charleston, appeared as editors in March 1867, after DeBow's death, and W. M. Burwell was editor from March 1868 to December 1879.

== Publication history ==
This magazine was often published monthly, with several interruptions, from January 1846 until June 1880, and then changed up through 1884. The magazine's publication was disrupted during the American Civil War after August 1864 but resumed in January 1866. After 1880, the magazine underwent a number of name revisions, and in 1884, it was either renamed to or absorbed by the Agricultural Review and Industrial Monthly of New York. (De Bow himself had died in 1867).

De Bow began this magazine in New Orleans in January 1846 as the Commercial Review of the South and West. It was published in New Orleans almost every year, except 1865, It was disrupted and 1864, when it was based in Columbia, South Carolina. He also published it in other cities as well: in Washington, DC, between 1853 and 1857 (during his tenure as Head of the US Census), continuing until 1860, and then in Charleston, South Carolina from 1861 to 1862. By the start of the Civil War, it was the most widely-circulated southern periodical. De Bow wrote much of each issue himself.

These were the editors of De Bow's Review: from January 1846 to February 1867, J. D. B. De Bow; from April 1867 to February 1868, R. G. Barnwell and E. Q. Bell; from March 1868 to December 1879, W. M. Burwell. DeBow's Review was published in New Orleans, 1846–1852; then New Orleans and Washington, DC, 1853–1860; New Orleans and Charleston, South Carolina, 1861–1862; only Columbia, South Carolina, in 1864; then again in New Orleans, 1866–1880.

== Content ==
Prior to the American Civil War (1861–1865), the journal contained everything from agricultural reports, statistical data, and economic analysis to literature, political opinion, and commentary. The magazine took an increasingly pro-Southern and eventually secessionist perspective in the late 1850s and the early 1860s. It defended slavery in response to Abolitionism, published an article in the 1850s that urged the South to resume the African slave trade, and advocated Southern nationalism as the Civil War approached. Samuel A. Cartwright's article on drapetomania was published by DeBow's.

After the war, the magazine resumed publication on commercial, political, and cultural topics; urged acceptance of the Reconstruction program of the Union under President Andrew Johnson; and even printed articles from former abolitionists.

== Contributors ==
DeBow's Review was known for several famous historical figures, both esteemed and controversial, who published material in the magazine:

- Judah P. Benjamin
- J. D. B. DeBow (editor)
- George Fitzhugh
- James H. Hammond
- Thomas Prentice Kettell
- Francis Lieber
- Matthew Fontaine Maury
- Albert Pike
- Edmund Ruffin
- William Gilmore Simms
- Lysander Spooner
- William Henry Trescot
- William Henry Chase

Other contributors from 1847 to 1867 included R. G. Barnwell, Edwin Q. Bell, and William MacCreary Burwell.

== Index ==
- Nachman, Selma (January–April 1912). "A collation of De Bow's review, giving the date, the numbering, and the title of each issue and volume, from 1846 to 1880". Bulletin of the Bibliographical Society of America. 4 (1–2): 27–32. doi:10.1086/bullbiblsociamer.4.1_2.24306442. hdl:2027/uc2.ark:/13960/t6b283g18.
