= Dromomania =

Historical psychiatric diagnosis

Dromomania was a historical psychiatric diagnosis whose primary symptom was uncontrollable urge to walk or wander. Dromomania has also been referred to as traveling fugue. Non-clinically, the term has come to be used to describe a desire for frequent traveling or wanderlust.

== Etymology ==
The term dromomania is derived from combining the Greek dromos, meaning "running" with the root mania. The term has sometimes been clinical and pathologizing, and other times been descriptive of unusual enthusiasm without negative or medicalizing connotations, reflecting the diverse uses of the term mania itself.

In the 17th century, the term mania came to be used to describe any show of great enthusiasm for a specific activity or object. Later, it came to be used as a suffix for Greek words to refer to an irrational obsession, such as in the words hippomania, and nymphomania. At the same time emerged the French -manie, such as in bibliomanie, which was borrowed into English as bibliomania. The original sense of enthusiasm without the sense of irrationality continued, as can be seen in Coleridge's late (1772–1843) use of the term scribbleomania.

== Clinical usage ==
=== 19th and early 20th centuries ===
Dromomania was a historical psychiatric diagnosis whose primary symptom was an irresistible urge to aimlessly wander, travel, or walk. Dromomania has also been referred to as traveling fugue.

Some authors describe patients with this diagnosis as being "in an automatic state" as they traveled, experiencing partial amnesia of the events of their journeys. Other symptoms included a "loss of sense of personal identity, ... and impulses to homicide and suicide".

Dromomania was regarded as a kind of impulse control disorder similar to kleptomania or pyromania.

Dromomania was primarily described by French psychiatrists. The concept of dromomania was adapted in America into drapetomania, a mental disorder whose primary symptom was running away. This diagnosis was applied only to enslaved people.

Modern bioethicist Henk A. M. J. ten Have regards dromomania as equivalent to the DSM IV diagnosis of dissociative fugue and the historical diagnoses of Wandertrieb (German) and automatisme ambulatoire (French).

=== Example cases ===
Many cases of dromomania have been described. The most famous case was that of Jean-Albert Dadas, a gas-fitter from Bordeaux, France. Dadas would suddenly set out on foot and reach cities as far away as Prague, Vienna or Moscow with no memory of his travels. A medical student, Philippe Tissié, wrote about Dadas in his doctoral dissertation in 1887.

Jean-Martin Charcot presented a similar case he called automatisme ambulatoire, French for "ambulatory automatism", or "walking around without being in control of one's own actions".

=== Social context ===
Dromomania is one of a constellation of social constructs to describe contemporary nomadic lifestyles, along with bum, brodyaga, hobo, vagrant, divagate, itinerant, vagabond, transient, tramp, rogue, wanderer Within this constellation, dromomania is an extreme pathologizing term.

In the early 20th century, dromomania was classified as one of a number of criminal manias, which were understood to involve irresistible compulsions to act without any motivation and sometimes against the preferences of the actor. Other such criminal manias were kleptomania, pyromania, and dipsomania. The American Prison Association described all of these criminal manias as common among people with psychopathic personalities, who were also described as lacking in purpose and ambition.

Dromomania was sometimes equated with propensity to vagrancy. The construct has been involved in the regulation of homelessness. It associated with the belief that homeless travelers lose the capacity to live in homes and maintain stability.

Travel writer Richard Grant has suggested that dromomania as a disorder is defined by sedentary cultures which pathologize a desire for travel that is present as an instinct in humans from their history as nomadic hunter-gatherers. Frequent travelers such as Francis Xavier have been suspected of having dromomania.

=== 21st century ===
During the 20th century, this diagnosis fell into disuse. However, since 2000 articles have appeared describing dromomania as a potential consequence of Alzheimer's disease, dementia, and delirium. There have been attempts to treat dromomania with antipsychotic medications.

== Nonclinical usage ==
More generally, the term is sometimes used to describe people who have a strong emotional or even physical need to be constantly traveling and experiencing new places, often at the expense of their normal family, work, and social lives.

Some authors have negatively referred to the high prevalence and cultural value of frequent long-distance travel in contemporary Western culture as hypermobility or dromomania.

In a 1977 book, cultural theorist Paul Virilio criticized modernity for acculturating people to become insanely addicted to pursuing the future and unable to stop, which he characterized as "dromomania". Virilio's analysis of contemporary culture has continued to be endorsed by other cultural theorists and regarded as even more accurate after the growth of finance capitalism and globalization.

== See also ==
- Anti-homelessness legislation – Laws regarding homelessness
- Dissociative fugue – Dissociative disorder
- Drapetomania – Purported mental illness of slaves
- Gypsy (term)
- Hypermobility (travel) – Act of taking frequent trips
- Mental disorder
  - Classification of mental disorders
- New Age travellers – Category of people in the UK living alternative lifestyles
- Nomadism – Person without fixed habitat
- Transhumance – Type of pastoralism
- Vagrancy – Condition of homelessness without regular employment or income
