= Domna C. Stanton =

American professor

Domna C. Stanton (born November 29, 1938) is an American professor, currently a Distinguished Professor of French at Graduate Center of the City University of New York.

== Early life and education ==
Born in Athens, Greece, on November 29, 1938, her career began with a move to the United States. After completing a Bachelor of Arts in French at Wellesley College in 1960, she transitioned to Columbia University, earning her Master of Arts two years later. Her formal training culminated in 1969 with a Ph.D. in French Literature, also from Columbia, a credential that launched her professional career as a faculty member at Barnard College, where she remained until 1976.

== Career ==
The 1980s marked a significant expansion of her research scope. Following the publication of her seminal work, "The Aristocrat as Art: A Study of the Honnête Homme and the Dandy in 17th- and 19th-Century French Literature" (1980), she accepted a professorship at the University of Michigan in 1982.

During her nearly two-decade tenure in Michigan, her scholarship pivoted toward the intersection of literature, gender, and social history. This era saw the release of texts such as "Discourses of Sexuality from Aristotle to AIDS" (1992) and "Feminisms in the Academy" (1995). Her institutional impact was solidified in 1999 when she was named the Elizabeth M. Douvan Collegiate Professor, a position she held until achieving emerita status in 2001.
