= Kansas City Actors Theatre =

American theatre company

The Kansas City Actors Theatre (KCAT) is a non-profit theatre company in Kansas City, Missouri.

== History ==
Started in 2004, Kansas City Actors Theatre was founded in order to "challenge and enlighten the Kansas City community by producing classic and modern-classic plays using Kansas City theatre artists". The company presents a collection of plays that are integrated either over a season or in rotating repertory, in order to deepen the appreciation of each play.

The theatre is also known to be a place for young local actors to obtain experience in a professional setting. The artist-led theatre company often collaborates with theatre students from the UMKC Theatre. This mission was exemplified when it was the first theatre company to present Lanford Wilson's Tally Trilogy in repertory.

In 2015, KCAT was awarded the American Theatre Wing's National Theatre Company Grant.

KCAT uses professional actors in various performance spaces around Kansas City, Missouri. Notably, KCAT has produced productions at the National World War I Museum, H&R Block City Stage, and in Union Station. Many founders of KCAT are also professors at UMKC Theatre (the theatre department of the University of Missouri–Kansas City), including Tom Mardikes.

For a short period, starting in 2006, KCAT changed its name to Actors Theatre, but the name returned to the original name shortly after.
