= Unicorn Theatre (Kansas City) =

Theater in Missouri, United States

Coordinates: 39°3′26″N 94°35′11″W

- Formation: 1974
- Type: Theatre group
- Location: Kansas City, Missouri
- Artistic director: Cynthia Levin
- Website: https://www.unicorntheatre.org

The Unicorn Theatre (Kansas City) is a not-for-profit theatre operating in Kansas City, Missouri. It has a history of premiering cutting-edge contemporary plays and musicals that have never before been produced in the area.

== History ==
In 1974, three UMKC Theatre graduates – Rohn Dennis, Liz Gordon, and Jim Cairns - turned a rented warehouse in Kansas City's River Market area into a locally based theatre company named "Theatre Warehouse." The group's name was changed to the Unicorn Theatre in 1981, after letterhead paper was donated to the nascent company with a unicorn printed at the top. The Unicorn joined Actors' Equity Association, the national union for professional actors and stage managers, in 1984. The theatre draws its company of actors largely from the greater Kansas City area, but its productions also frequently feature performers from regional theatre communities in Chicago, St. Louis, and various other cities across the United States.

The Unicorn moved to its current location on Main Street in 1986, when it transformed an 80-year-old parking garage into a functional, intimate theatre space with a thrust stage. The space underwent renovations in 1996 to include a new box office, lobby, rehearsal space, administrative office, and a Main Street entrance. The structure itself houses two performance spaces: a 152-seat Mainstage theatre, and the Jerome Stage, a second 122-seat theatre. A $2 million Next Stage Capital Campaign was launched in 2004 to renovate and expand the theatre, and the Unicorn opened the Jerome Stage in 2008, naming it after Norge W. Jerome, a nutritional anthropologist and former Unicorn theatre board member.

In 1981, Cynthia Levin became Producing Artistic Director of the theatre. Levin announced at the start of the theatre's 40th-anniversary 2013–2014 season that the Unicorn will be launching a Longevity Campaign to raise the funds necessary to make the theatre the only of its kind in Kansas City to purchase and own its performance space.

== New play development ==
The Unicorn is a founding member of the National New Play Network (NNPN), an alliance established in 1998 to support the development of new plays. As a part of their membership with NNPN, the Unicorn produces Rolling World Premieres, part of the Continued Life of New Plays Fund, to support production of a new play within a 12-month period. Since 1981, each season at the Unicorn has featured at least one world-premiere production. To date, the theatre has produced 58 world-premiere productions during the span of their 40 years of operation.
