= Patricia McIlrath =

American theatre director

Patricia Anne McIlrath
- Born: January 25, 1917; Kansas City, Missouri
- Died: March 4, 1999 (aged 82); Kansas City, Missouri

Patricia Anne McIlrath (January 25, 1917 – March 4, 1999) was an American educator and theatre director who was pivotal in the founding of the Missouri Repertory Theatre (known today as the Kansas City Repertory Theatre) and in the development of Regional Theatre within the area surrounding Kansas City, Missouri.

== Early life ==
McIlrath was born in El Paso, Texas, to George David McIlrath, a lawyer, and his wife Ethel in 1917. She graduated from Paseo High School in 1933, and received a B.A. from Grinnell College and an M.A. from Northwestern University before graduating from Stanford University in 1951 with her Ph.D., which McIlrath earned while on leave from the University of Illinois, where she held a faculty position in the Department of Speech and Theatre between 1946 and 1954.

== Career ==
McIlrath was hired by the University of Kansas City in 1954 as a professor of theatre and director of its University Playhouse. In 1959, while professionally directing Sophocles' Electra at the Rita Allen Theatre in New York City, McIlrath found herself dismayed at the divide that existed between her academic theatre training and the demands of professional theatrical production. As a result, she became unquestionably convinced of the necessity to integrate professional theatre training into the curriculum of academic theatre programs in the United States.

To that end, McIlrath founded the UMKC Summer Repertory Theatre in 1964 (the same year in which the private University of Kansas City was inducted into the public University of Missouri system, becoming the University of Missouri-Kansas City). The company soon changed its name to the Missouri Repertory Theatre, achieved professional status as an Equity organization in 1966, and founded its own touring wing—Missouri Vanguard Theatre—in 1968. McIlrath remained the head of UMKC Theatre until 1984, and retired as Artistic Director of the Missouri Repertory Theatre in 1985.

== Influence ==
McIlrath's desire to establish both a training ground for professional theatre artists in Kansas City, and a venue in the city at which audiences could attend professional theatre rivaling the caliber of that produced in New York City, corresponded with the work of numerous other well-known members of the Regional Theatre Movement, such as Margo Jones, Zelda Fichandler, Michael Murray, and Tyrone Guthrie. Prior to the founding of the Missouri Rep, the residents of Kansas City and the surrounding metropolitan area had been virtually devoid of any source of locally based professional theatre for several decades. The founding of the Missouri Rep served as the impetus which led to the revival of professional theatre in the area. Following in the wake of the Missouri Rep, numerous other professional theatre companies established in the city since the 1970s have found lasting success, such as the Unicorn Theatre, the Coterie Theatre, the New Theatre, and the American Heartland Theatre. In 1989, the Kansas City-based art journal Forum wrote of McIlrath's influence: "Before her arrival, there was no legitimate, locally produced, professional theatre in Kansas City. Now the city boasts 10 equity theatres in a market area of only 1.5 million people. All of those theatres are headed by people who got their start in professional theatre under Patricia McIlrath."

== Personal life ==
McIlrath never married or had any children of her own, but following her retirement devoted herself to a close-knit family consisting of "thirteen nieces and nephews and twenty three grand nieces and nephews." She died on March 4, 1999, at the age of 82, and is buried at Calvary Cemetery in Kansas City, Missouri.
