= UMKC Theatre =

- Former names: Department of Speech, Department of Speech and Theatre
- Established: 1954
- Affiliations: University of Missouri-Kansas City
- Chair: Tom Mardikes
- Location: Kansas City, Missouri, United States

UMKC Theatre is a graduate and undergraduate academic department of the University of Missouri-Kansas City (UMKC) that provides both educational and professional training in multiple areas of theatrical production, including acting, scenic design, lighting design, costume design, sound design, dramaturgy and historical research, playwriting, and stage management, and maintains a strong connection with the Kansas City Repertory Theatre (KCRT), the leading regional theatre in the Kansas City area.

== History ==
Theatrical production at the University of Missouri-Kansas City began almost immediately after the institution was founded as the University of Kansas City in 1933. The first play produced on the university campus was Rachel Crothers' Mary the Third in the summer of 1934, followed by Sophocles' classic tragedy Antigone in the winter of that same year. In 1948, a permanent theatre structure was constructed on campus by adapting an abandoned camp theatre building left over from a deactivated United States Air Force base, and Dr. John Newfield was hired to serve as the first professional director of the new University Playhouse. A former director of theatre and opera whose work had been produced throughout New York City and Europe, Newfield inaugurated the university's first Master of Arts degree in Theatre as a component of its Department of English upon his arrival.

However, it was not until the university hired Dr. Patricia McIlrath in 1954 as Newfield's replacement that an academic department sovereign from the Department of English was established to take on the dual responsibility of producing theatre on campus and training students in the history and methodology of theatrical production. Initially serving as chair of the Department of Speech, McIlrath was selected to lead a newly formed Department of Speech and Theatre after the private University of Kansas City was inducted into the public University of Missouri system in 1963. A fully independent Department of Theatre was established at UMKC in 1972. As the head of UMKC Theatre, McIlrath played a paramount role in the development of regional theatre in the Kansas City area, founding the UMKC Summer Repertory Theatre in 1964. The company, which changed its name to the Missouri Repertory Theatre in 1968, and once again to the Kansas City Repertory Theatre in 2004, quickly gained Equity status to emerge as one of the leading regional theatres in the American Midwest. In addition, UMKC Theatre became a founding member of the National Association of Schools of Theatre in 1965 and a founding member of the University/Resident Theatre Association in 1969, two institutions with which it still maintains accreditation. Following McIlrath's retirement as Founding Chair of the UMKC Theatre in 1984 and Founding Artistic Director of the Missouri Repertory Theatre in 1985, the responsibilities of leading the academic department of UMKC Theatre and of directing the professional company of Missouri Repertory Theatre (Kansas City Repertory Theatre) were separated, but the two institutions remain closely linked to this day.

Since its establishment in the 1960s, the department has had numerous alumni go on to find success in the fields of stage, film, and television. In addition, numerous professional theatres in modern-day Kansas City were founded by former students or employees of UMKC Theatre. Performances at the UMKC University Playhouse ceased production in the 1970s. Today, the mainstage performance space of the university is the Helen F. Spencer Theatre, a 630-seat proscenium space located in the James C. Olson Performing Arts Center and shared with the Kansas City Repertory Theatre. UMKC Theatre also regularly stages productions in Studio 116, a blackbox performance space located within same building. With a training mission of serving as a teaching hospital for the theatre, UMKC Theatre frequently engages in co-productions with various professional theatre companies throughout the Kansas City area, including the Kansas City Repertory Theatre, the Unicorn Theatre, the Coterie Theatre, and Kansas City Actors Theatre, and has presented theatrical works at multiple off-campus venues in recent years, such as the City Stage Theatre in Union Station (Kansas City) and the J.C. Nichols Theatre at the National World War I Museum.

The current chairperson of UMKC Theatre is Professor Tom Mardikes, who has served as chair of the department since 2001.

== Degrees Offered ==
The UMKC Theatre offers degrees at both the undergraduate and postgraduate levels. Its Bachelor of Arts degree program in Theatre focuses on providing undergraduate students with a broad educational experience that includes all aspects of theatrical production, but allows students to select a specific field of emphasis, such as performance or design. In the early 1980s, the University of Missouri-Kansas City was granted the authority to offer the only Master of Fine Arts degrees in theatre in the State of Missouri. Terminal MFA degrees are available to graduate students seeking to obtain professional educations in acting, costume design, lighting design, scenic design, sound design, stage management, or technical direction. In addition, the department offers a Master of Arts degree with an emphasis in either playwriting or in theatre history and dramatic literature to graduate students interested in either a literary or research-oriented education in the theatre arts, and in obtaining practical experience in dramaturgy.

== Notable faculty ==
- John Ezell
- Felicia Hardison Londré
- Theodore Swetz
- Tom Mardikes
- Patricia McIlrath
