= Felicia Hardison Londré =

American theatrical historian

Felicia Hardison Londré (born April 1, 1941) is Curators’ Professor of Theatre Emerita at the University of Missouri-Kansas City (UMKC). She specializes in 19th and 20th-century American, French, and Russian theatre history, as well as in Shakespearean dramaturgy.

== Early life ==
Londré was born in Fort Lewis, Washington, to Col. Felix M. Hardison and his wife Priscilla Mae (Graham) Hardison in 1941. She attended the University of Montana, where she earned a B.A. in French with a minor in drama, following which she received a Fulbright grant to study for one year at the University of Caen in Normandy. She completed her M.A. at the University of Washington in Romance Languages (also with a minor in drama) and her Ph.D. in Speech at the University of Wisconsin–Madison.

== Career ==
After serving as an assistant professor at the University of Wisconsin–Rock County and briefly as Head of Theatre at the University of Texas at Dallas, Londré became an associate professor at the University of Missouri-Kansas City in 1975, a full professor at the university in 1978, and was named a Curators’ Professor for the University of Missouri System in 1987. In 2001, she won the Association for Theatre in Higher Education’s national award for Outstanding Teacher of Theatre in Higher Education. She was elected to serve a two-year term as Dean of the College of Fellows of the American Theatre (for 2012–2014) in 2011.

From 1978 to 2000, Londré was dramaturg and literary manager for the Missouri Repertory Theatre (now the Kansas City Repertory Theatre) and served as dramaturg for the Nebraska Shakespeare Festival from 1990 to 2009. She is the Honorary Co-Founder of the Heart of America Shakespeare Festival, was Founding Secretary of the Shakespeare Theatre Association of America, and is a recognized Oxfordian scholar in the field of Shakespearean authorship. Londré is also an expert on Kansas City theatre history, and has been involved in various attempts to preserve historic performing arts buildings throughout the city.

== Works ==
Londré’s published work includes over 60 scholarly articles, 25 journalistic publications, 100 book and theatre reviews, and 14 books. Her book The Enchanted Years of the Stage: Kansas City at the Crossroads of American Theater, 1870-1930 won the Theatre Library Association’s George Freedley Memorial Book Award in 2008. In addition to her print publications, Londré has given numerous lectures over theatre and drama to audiences in cities across the world, including in Beijing, Venice, Nanjing, Tokyo, Osaka, Moscow, Rouen, Caen, Paris, Brussels, and Budapest.
