= Irwin Army Community Hospital =

United States Army medical facility at Fort Riley, Kansas

Coordinates: 39.0830°N 96.7685°W

The Irwin Army Community Hospital is a US Army medical facility at Fort Riley, Kansas.

== History ==
The Irwin Army Community Hospital in Fort Riley, named after Brigadier general Bernard John Dowling Irwin, opened in February 1958. The 47-bed facility was fully accredited by the Joint Commissions on Accreditation of Healthcare Organizations and served a population of more than 30,000.

On October 16, 2016, the new 550,669 square foot IACH opened. The new facility is 47% bigger than the old one and can accommodate more patients with the addition of beds in the emergency and labor, delivery, recovery and postpartum unit.

On June 14, 2022, Col. Anthony D. Gray took command of Irwin Army Community Hospital from Col. Edgar G. Arroyo in a ceremony held at Fort Riley's Cavalry Parade Field.

The hospital was awarded the Gold Seal of Approval by the Joint Commission in November 2024.
