= Donald Manford =

American politician

Donald L. Manford

Member of the Missouri Senate from the 8th district
- In office elected 1968 – 1978

Personal details
- Born: May 20, 1934 Kansas City, Missouri
- Died: 1991 (aged 56–57)
- Party: Democratic
- Spouse(s): Carol J. Von Demfang; Judith Mooney
- Children: 4 (2 sons, 2 daughters)
- Education: University of Kansas City
- Occupation: politician, lawyer

Donald L. Manford (May 20, 1934 - 1991) was an American politician who served in the Missouri Senate and the Missouri House of Representatives. He served in the U.S. Navy from 1952 until 1956 during the period of the Korean War. Manford was previously elected to the Missouri House of Representatives in 1966, serving until 1968.

He died in 1991.
