= The Protest Psychosis =

2010 book by Jonathan Metzl

The Protest Psychosis: How Schizophrenia Became a Black Disease
- First edition
- Author: Jonathan Metzl
- Subject: Psychiatry
- Publisher: Beacon Press
- Publication date: 2010
- Publication place: United States
- Media type: Print
- Pages: 246
- ISBN: 0-8070-8592-8
- OCLC: 319496892

The Protest Psychosis: How Schizophrenia Became a Black Disease is a 2010 book by the psychiatrist Jonathan Metzl (who also has a Ph.D. in American studies), and published by Beacon Press, covering the history of the 1960s Ionia State Hospital, located in Ionia, Michigan, and converted into the Ionia Correctional Facility in 1986. The book describes the facility as one of America's largest and most notorious state psychiatric hospitals in the era before deinstitutionalization.

Metzl focuses on exposing the hospital's history of disproportionately diagnosing African Americans with schizophrenia because of their support for civil rights. He suggests that in part the sudden influx of such diagnoses could be traced to a change in wording in the DSM-II, which compared to the previous edition added "hostility" and "aggression" as signs of the disorder. Metzl writes that this change resulted in structural racism.

A 1974 ad for the drug Haldol published in the medical journal Archives of General Psychiatry, and reproduced in the book. Author Metzl states that the advertisement shows an attempt to equate racial unrest with mental illness.

The book was well reviewed in JAMA, where it was described as "a fascinating, penetrating book by one of medicine's most exceptional young scholars". The book was also reviewed in the American Journal of Psychiatry, Psychiatric Services, Transcultural Psychiatry, Psychiatric Times, The American Journal of Bioethics, Social History of Medicine, Medical Anthropology Quarterly, Journal of African American History, Journal of Black Psychology, Health: An Interdisciplinary Journal for the Social Study of Health, Illness and Medicine, and The Sixties: A Journal of History, Politics and Culture.

== See also ==
- Political abuse of psychiatry in the United States
  - Drapetomania
- Political abuse of psychiatry
- Sluggish schizophrenia
- List of medical ethics cases
