= Wanderlust =

Strong desire to travel the world

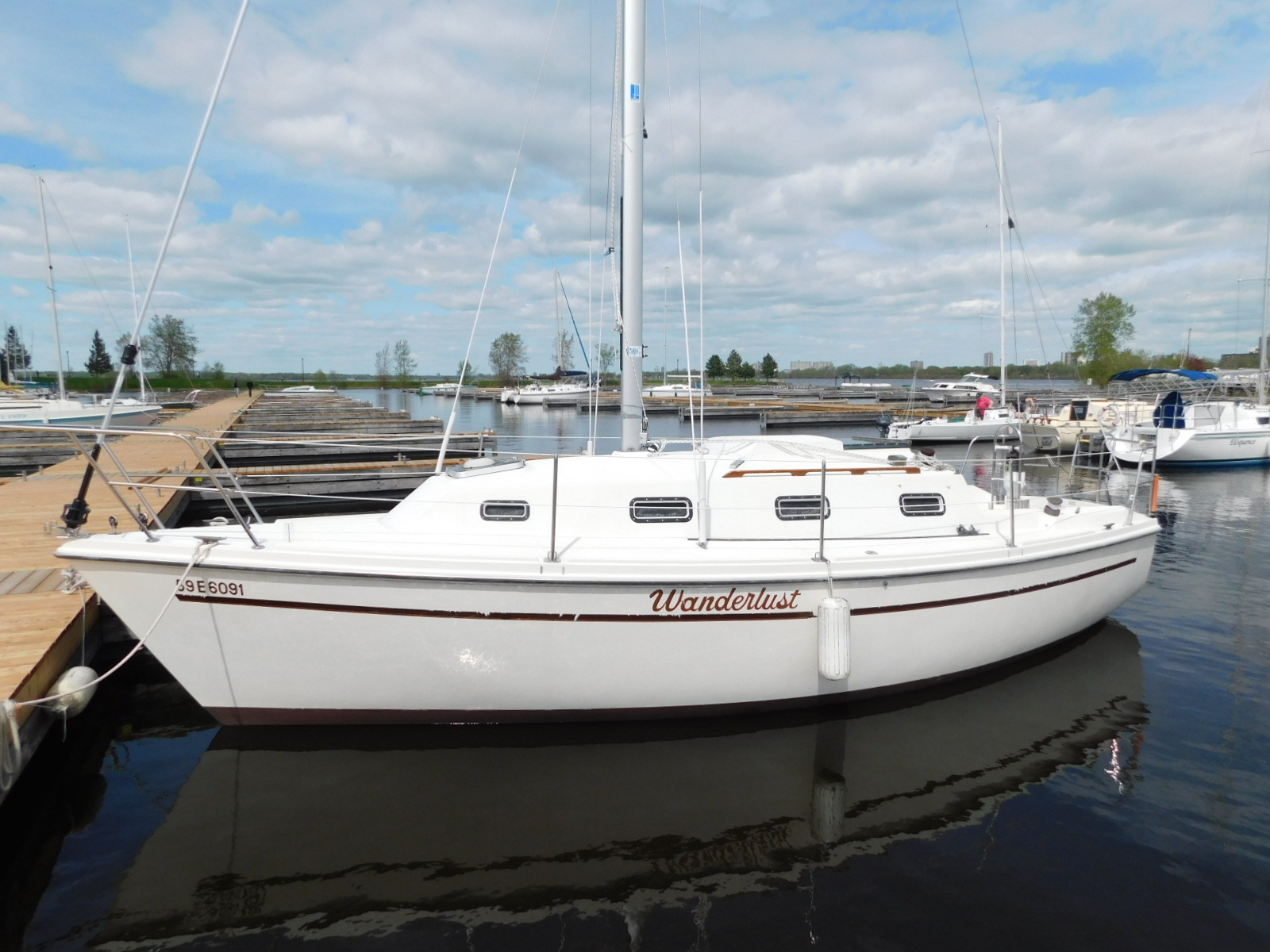
A recreational sailboat named "Wanderlust"

Wanderlust is a strong desire to wander or travel and explore the world. The term has its roots in German Romanticism.

== Etymology ==
The first documented use of the term in English occurred in 1902 as a reflection of what was then seen as a characteristically German predilection for wandering that may be traced back to German Romanticism and the German system of apprenticeship (the journeyman), as well as the custom of adolescent wanderings in search of unity with nature.

The term originates from the German words wandern ('to hike') and Lust ('desire'), literally translated as 'enjoyment of hiking', although it is commonly described as 'enjoyment of strolling, roaming about, or wandering'.

In recent years, the word Wanderlust is less commonly used in German, having been largely supplanted in the sense of 'desire to travel' by Fernweh ('a longing for far-away places'), coined as an antonym to Heimweh, 'homesickness', or 'travel fever' (Reisefieber).

== Sociology ==
Robert E. Park in the early twentieth century saw wanderlust as in opposition to the values of status and organisation, while postmodernism would by contrast see it largely as playfully empowering.

In post-Enlightenment Europe, upper-class bachelors were encouraged to embark upon a Bildungsreise (roughly, 'cultural education journey'), often sightseeing trips to Italy or France.

Among tourists, sociologists distinguish sunlust from wanderlust as motivating forces – the former primarily seeking relaxation, the latter engagement with different cultural experiences.

== Psychology ==
Wanderlust may reflect an intense urge for self-development by experiencing the unknown, confronting unforeseen challenges, getting to know unfamiliar cultures, ways of life and behaviours. There is a certain satisfaction in novelty-seeking and stepping beyond one's comfort zone. Curiosity plays a significant role in the psychology of wanderlust. This sensation may be understood through the concept of noninstrumental curiosity, whereby humans are driven to seek information and explore possibilities not necessarily for practical rewards, but for the satisfaction of discovery. Research suggests that individuals can be particularly curious about desirable future outcomes which can be seen as gains while tending to avoid information associated with undesirable possibilities or losses. This may help explain why people romanticise unfamiliar destinations, imagine alternative lives elsewhere and feel excited by experiences they have yet to encounter, for in their minds it's a positive reality, not necessarily a real one.

Or there may be other reasons to crave other opportunities the world has to offer, driven by the desire to escape and leave behind depressive feelings of guilt. This has been linked to bipolar disorder in the periodicity of the attacks.In adolescence, dissatisfaction with the restrictions of home and locality may also fuel the desire to travel. It can be common in youth to associate their familiar surroundings with limitations and routine, parental supervision, and an expired version of themselves, which makes travel and new places serve as an escapism from feeling new and under no surveillance from family, friends, and the version of themselves that is familiar to home.

== Identity ==
Travel is commonly associated with the concept of "finding yourself", as it can provide opportunities to develop a broader perspective of one's place in the world. Exposure to unfamiliar environments, cultures and experiences may influence an individual's understanding of themselves and their surroundings. Travel can also introduce individuals to opportunities and perspectives that may not be readily accessible within their usual environment and can lead them to realisations and reassessments of identity.

The preoccupation with travel may also contribute to the development of independence and self-reliance. This can occur through both solo and group travel, as individuals are often required to make decisions, navigate unfamiliar situations and adapt to different cultural and social expectations. Being removed from familiar surroundings may provide opportunities to exercise greater autonomy and take responsibility for personal experiences. The desire for independence may also be a motivating factor in travel, distinct from the desire to escape one's existing circumstances.

The concept of "sonder", a phrase coined in 2013 by John Koenig in his Dictionary of Obscure Sorrows, "the realisation and understanding that all other people have lives as complex as one's own". It comes with the drastic understanding of just how large the world is with the billions of issues, stresses, and joys circulating on earth, and the epiphony comes commonly with travelling and seeing firsthand strangers suffering, laughing and connecting in new places.

== Film and Television ==
The urges and desire to travel have a strong link to film and TV and the romanticism of travelling abroad. Known as "set jetting” and, in recent years, "the White Lotus Effect", it is common for tourists to be attracted to places that were seen romanticised on their screens.

It can be explained that the years after Covid, when streaming services provided many picturesque destinations whilst the world was stuck at home, have led to an increase in the desire to travel.

There are many examples from pre-Covid times, such as Roman Holiday (1953), which helped popularise Rome as a cinematic destination. As well as The Sound of Music (1965), which has been associated with tourism to Salzburg and its surrounding filming locations.

Yet there are many studies that show these same trends, such as Singapore, post-Crazy Rich Asians (2018), and Dubrovnik,Croatia,from Game of Thrones (2011-2019)

== See also ==
- Cabin fever
- Digital nomad
- Dromomania
- Global nomad
- Hypermobility (travel)
- Knight-errant
- New Age travellers
- Nomad
- Romanticism
- Overlanding
- Pilgrimage
- Rumspringa
- The Seafarer
- Sehnsucht
- Tourism
- Walkabout
- WWOOF
