= Kansas City Repertory Theatre =

American theatre company

Kansas City Repertory Theatre
Attendance: 100,000 patrons annually,
10,000 through education/community outreach
Employment: Over 200 professional artists and staff

Spencer Theatre, interior
Located in the James C. Olson Center for the Performing Arts
Seats: 585

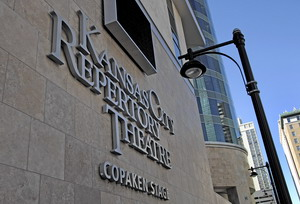

Copaken Stage, exterior
Located in downtown Kansas City in the H&R Block headquarters
Seats: 317

Kansas City Repertory Theatre is a professional resident theater company serving the Kansas City metropolitan area, and is the professional theater-in-residence at the University of Missouri–Kansas City (UMKC).

The theatre has had five artistic directors: founder Dr. Patricia McIlrath, from 1964 until she retired in 1985; George Keathley was artistic director from 1985–2000; producing artistic director Peter Altman, who retired in July 2007; Eric Rosen; and the current artistic director, Stuart Carden.

== The Rep under Patricia McIlrath (1964–1985) ==
Appointed chairman of the University of Kansas City (now UMKC) Theatre Department and director of the University Playhouse in 1954, Patricia McIlrath created a program to provide undergraduate and graduate students the opportunity to work in a professional theatre, alongside professional actors. Coinciding with the rise of regional theater in the United States, she formed the UMKC Summer Repertory Theatre in 1964.

That same founding year, 1964, James Costin was appointed the Summer Rep's administrative director, creating a partnership that would continue for twenty years.

Professional actors, community players, and members of the UMKC Theatre Department, operating on a shoestring budget, worked together that first season to present the Summer Rep's two-week fledgling season. Fifteen hundred patrons attended performances of The Corn Is Green by Emlyn Williams and Private Lives by Noël Coward, both performing out of a quonset hut on the UMKC campus.

In 1967, the Rep became affiliated with Actors' Equity Association, the national union of professional actors. In 1968, McIlrath launched a touring program called Missouri Repertory Theatre, and began recruiting nationally acclaimed artists to work in this program.

In 1979, the company moved into the Helen F. Spencer Theatre in the newly constructed James C. Olson Center for the Performing Arts. The theatre was named for Helen Elizabeth Foresman Spencer (1902–1982) who, along with her husband Kenneth Aldred Spencer (died 1960), built the Spencer Chemical Company which was ultimately sold to the Gulf Oil Company in 1963. The assets of both Spencers would go into the Kenneth A. and Helen F. Spencer Foundation which provided philanthropies throughout the Kansas City area.

That same year marked the not-for-profit incorporation of Missouri Repertory Theatre, under the name MRT, Inc. (later changed to Missouri Repertory Theatre, Inc.), formalizing the long-standing partnership between the UMKC and Kansas City's civic leaders through the creation of a volunteer board of directors.

UMKC provided critical sustaining support in the early years of this new not-for-profit corporation, and it continues to support the Rep in a number of ways:

- through direct cash support on an annual basis,
- by allowing the Rep in-kind use of UMKC's spaces for its administrative offices, the technical facilities needed to create scenery, costumes, lighting, and sound,
- the use of Helen F. Spencer Theatre

The Rep, directed by its board, has now operated independently of UMKC Theatre, continues to benefit of maintaining its close relationship with the university and its theatretraining programs.

McIlrath retired in 1985.

== The Rep under George Keathley (1985–2000) ==
An extensive search for McIlrath's successor led to the appointment of George Keathley as the new artistic director. With thirty-five years of experience in acting, directing, and producing, Keathley built on the traditions of the company while introducing new dimensions and programming to the theatre. He introduced Rep audiences to such contemporary writers as Athol Fugard, David Mamet and Peter Shaffer, and continued the classic tradition with Shakespeare, Sophocles and Molière. At his retirement in 2000, Keathley had personally directed 49 productions. Costin, who died in 2005, also retired in 2000, after completing thirty-six years at the administrative helm of the organization.

Upon their retirements, at the celebration welcoming their successor, Peter Altman, Keathley and Costin each offered a gift symbolizing the passing of their legacies to him. For Keathley, the gift was a glass elephant from the original production of The Glass Menagerie, which was given to him by Tennessee Williams many years before.

Costin's gift to Altman was an audience base of 100,000 and cash reserves and endowment funds of more than $10 million, making the Rep one of the nation's most financially stable institutions. Costin's gift provided Altman with resources to build on the artistic legacies of his predecessors.

== The Rep under Peter Altman (2000–2007) ==
A new era for the company began with Peter Altman assuming leadership in 2000 as producing artistic director. Altman came to the Rep after eighteen years as founding producing director of the Huntington Theatre Company in Boston. Under his direction and that of the theater's board of directors, led by William C. Nelson, Kansas City Rep was committed to building on its four-decade tradition, expanding its audience, upgrading and diversifying its range of artists, and extending its repertoire to include new work and large-scale classics. The board of directors voted in 2004 to rename the company Kansas City Repertory Theatre to reflect better its identity, location, and audience. That same year, a major refurbishment of Spencer Theatre was completed.

== The Rep under Eric Rosen (2007–2018) ==
Kansas City Repertory Theatre appointed Eric Rosen as its new artistic director in 2007. He was a co-founder and artistic director of About Face Theatre, an LGBT theatre located in Chicago, and is involved in the development of new work and a playwright.

Rosen started a new era at the Rep with an inaugural 2008/09 season that included the pre-New York run of the hip-hop musical Clay; August Wilson's final play in his ten-play cycle Radio Golf; Mary Zimmerman's epic Arabian Nights; a new musical based on Sherwood Anderson's novel Winesburg, Ohio; a new thriller, The Borderland; Tennessee Williams's The Glass Menagerie; and the French farce A Flea in Her Ear.

== The Rep under Stuart Carden (2019 – present) ==
Director, producer, and educator Stuart Carden joined KCRep as its fifth artistic director in September 2019. He helped establish the KCRep for All community tour, as well as the Ghost Light annual storytelling event.

== Two stages, one Rep ==
In February 2007, the Rep opened a second venue, Copaken Stage, a 317-seat theater located in the Kansas City Power & Light District, a shopping and entertainment district in downtown Kansas City.
