= Memorandum of Understanding on Conversion Therapy =

Joint statement against conversion therapy

The Memorandum of Understanding on Conversion Therapy (MoU) is a joint publication by a coalition of mental and physical health organisations in the United Kingdom disavowing the practice of conversion therapy. It was initially published in 2015 and only condemned sexual orientation change efforts, before being updated to include gender identity change efforts in 2017. Signatories include the Royal College of Psychiatrists, British Association for Counselling and Psychotherapy, NHS England, the British Psychoanalytic Council, and the Royal College of General Practitioners. The UK Council for Psychotherapy was a signatory to both editions, but withdrew in 2024 over the inclusion of protections for transgender children.

== History ==
In 2015, the Department of Health invited key figures from mental health organisations such as the Royal College of Psychiatrists, British Association for Counselling and Psychotherapy (BACP), and the UK Council for Psychotherapy to compile the MoU to attempt to abolish the practice of conversion therapy. 13 of the United Kingdom's major psychological bodies came together to pass a Memorandum disowning the practice.

The original version did not include transgender or asexual people. In 2016 Dominic Davies, the founder of LGBT counselling clinic Pink Therapy and one of the signatories, resigned from the BACP. He had pushed to include transgender and asexual people in the 2015 version and then to be included in a later update and the BACP had argued against it. The BACP stated their board was "unlikely to sign" it and there was no evidence of the populations receiving conversion therapy. In a statement to BuzzFeed News, they stated "BACP understands the principles that the proposed MoU is aiming to promote: at the same time, we understand that there is a debate about the evidence regarding conversion therapy and transgender issues".

In 2017, a revised Memorandum was published which included them. The 2017 MoU, headed by Dr. Igi Moon, was signed by organisations such as NHS England, the British Psychoanalytic Council, and the Royal College of General Practitioners. The 2017 version was signed by over 25 physical and mental health organisations with the stated aim "to end the practice of conversion therapy in the UK." It defined conversion therapy as:

a therapeutic approach, or any model or individual viewpoint that demonstrates any assumption that any sexual orientation or gender identity is inherently preferable to any other, and which attempts to bring about a change of sexual orientation or gender identity or seeks to suppress an individual's expression of sexual orientation or gender identity on that basis.

Parliament argued conversion therapy was not a major issue and that the MoU was enough to discourage the practice in 2017, though multiple evangelical organisations continue to advocate and practice conversion therapy. In 2022, the British government announced it would not include transgender people in an upcoming conversion therapy ban following lobbying from gender-critical groups. Prime Minister Boris Johnson stated "We will have a ban on gay conversion therapy, which to me is utterly abhorrent, but there are complexities and sensitivities when you move from the area of sexuality to the question of gender". The Coalition Against Conversion Therapy published an open letter calling for the ban to include all forms of conversion therapy. The director of gender-critical campaign group Transgender Trend criticised the letter, highlighting the interim report of the Cass Review.

=== UKCP withdrawal ===
In November 2023, the UK Council for Psychotherapy published a statement on gender critical views that "Psychotherapists and psychotherapeutic counsellors who hold such views are likely to believe that the clinically most appropriate approach to working therapeutically with individuals who present with gender dysphoria, particularly children and young people, is exploratory therapy, rather than medicalised interventions such as puberty blockers, cross-sex hormones or reassignment surgery." In April 2024 the UK Council for Psychotherapy withdrew from the Memorandum and membership of the Coalition against Conversion Therapy on the grounds of not wanting to oppose exploratory therapy for trans young people. The UKCP argued that the ban could ban "exploratory therapy" of why children want to change gender and the chairman of the UKCP told the Telegraph that "The current MoU makes no distinction between adults and children, which we believe is not in the best interest of children and could compromise their wellbeing."

Dr. Moon, head of the MoU, stated "It is with great regret that any organisation would want to leave the MOUv2 whose aim is to bring an end to conversion therapy" and "The MOU does not ask therapists to practise any model of therapy, all therapy models are exploratory to some degree". Directors of other signatory organisations also criticised the decision. A group called UKCP members Therapists Against Conversion Therapy and Transphobia (TACTT) published an open letter criticising the organisation and started a petition calling for the board's removal in response, which gained 1,500 signatures, more than 10% of the UKCP's membership. The board was retained as only 20% of voters called for their removal.

Despite the withdrawal, UKCP still states that it is against "all forms of conversion therapy" and encourages filings of complaints if any conversion therapy is practiced by UKCP members.

== Signatories ==
Signatories in 2024 include:

- Anna Freud National Centre for Children and Families
- Association for Family Therapy (AFT)
- Association of Christians in Counselling and Linked Professions
- British Association for Counselling and Psychotherapy (BACP)
- British Association of Arts Therapists (BAAT)
- British Association of Gender Identity Specialists (BAGIS)
- British Association of Behavioural and Cognitive Psychotherapies (BABCP)
- British Association of Drama Therapists (BADTH)
- British Psychoanalytic Council (BPC)
- British Psychological Society (BPS)
- CliniQ
- College of Sex and Relationship Therapists (COSRT)
- Complementary and Natural Healthcare Council
- Gendered Intelligence
- The LGBTQ+ Association of Doctors and Dentists (GLADD)
- Mental Health Network – NHS Confederation
- Mind
- National Counselling and Psychotherapy Society (NCPS)
- NHS England
- NHS Scotland
- NHS Wales
- Northern Ireland Humanists
- Psychological Professions Network
- Psychotherapy and Counselling Union (PCU)
- Relate
- Rethink Mental Illness
- Royal College of General Practitioners
- Royal College of Psychiatrists
- Spectra
