= New School of Psychotherapy and Counselling =

The New School of Psychotherapy and Counselling (NSPC) is a postgraduate institution in London, United Kingdom, focused on existential and phenomenological approaches to psychotherapy, counselling psychology, and coaching.

Its degree programmes are awarded and validated by Middlesex University, and accredited by UKCouncil for Psychotherapy (UKCP), the Health and Care Professions Council (HCPC), and the British Psychological Society (BPS). NSPC is also accredited by the British Accreditation Council.

== History ==
It was founded in 1996 by Emmy van Deurzen and Digby Tantam, with the support of Walter Leibrecht, Freddie Strasser, and Claire Arnold-Baker (then Claire Penhallow).

NSPC was established to provide training in existential psychotherapy grounded in philosophy and phenomenology. Its first four-year programme, validated by the University of Sheffield in 1998, became the first UK master's degree in existential psychotherapy. In 2003, NSPC entered a validation partnership with Middlesex University, leading to the introduction of doctoral degrees in Existential Psychotherapy and Counselling (DProf) and Counselling Psychology and Psychotherapy (DCPsych).

NSPC offers postgraduate degrees in psychotherapy, counselling psychology, existential coaching, autism and neurodiversity, diversity studies, and pastoral care.

The current Principal is Claire Arnold-Baker, and the Deputy Principal is Danny van Deurzen-Smith.

=== Research ===
Research at NSPC is coordinated through the Existential Research Academy (ERA), co-founded by van Deurzen and Tantam. It promotes practice-based inquiry into existential and humanistic therapies, contributing to the evidence base for phenomenological and integrative approaches in psychotherapy and psychology.

== Notable alumni ==
- Kris Akabusi – athlete and executive coach
- Chris Cleave – novelist and psychologist
- Stella Duffy – author and theatre director
- Aikaterini Fotopolou, Professor of Psychodynamic Neuroscience, University College London
