= November 25 =

November 25 this year in various calendars
- Wednesday, 25 November 2026
Akan	Fowukuo
Armenian	8 Kʿaloch 1476
Aztec	Tlacaxipehualiztli 14, 8 Mazātl
Babylonian	14 Arakhsamna, 2337 SE
Balinese pawukon	Menga, Pasah, Sri, Umanis, Tungleh, Buda of Kulantir, Sri, Nohan, Suka
Bengali	10 Ogrohayon, BS 1433
Chinese	Yin Water Rabbit・Wall Mansion; Fire Horse Year, Month 10, Day 17 (Xiaoxue, 12 days until Daxue)
Common Era	25 November 2026 CE
Coptic	16 Hathor, AM 1743
Egyptian	13 Pharmuthi, 2775 NE
Ethiopian	16 H̱edār, 2019 Amätä Məhrät
French Republican	Décade I, Quartidi de Frimaire de l'Année 235 de la République
Gregorian	25 November, AD 2026
Hebrew	15 Kislev, AM 5787
Hindu	Rohiṇi・Śiva; Solar: 9 Mārgaśīrṣa, 1948 SE; Lunisolar: Pratipada, Kṛishna pakṣa of Kārtika, 2083 VE; Rāudra・5127 KY・1,872,904
Icelandic	Miðvikudagur, 3 Ýlir 2026
Islamic	14 Jumada al-thani, AH 1448 (using tabular method)
ISO week date	2026-W48-3
Japanese	17 Kannazuki, Reiwa 8 (Shōsetsu, 12 days until Taisetsu)
Julian	12 November, AD 2026 (AM 7535)
Julian day	2461370
Korean	17 Dwaejidal, 4359 DE
Maya	13.0.14.2.7; 0 Mac, 8 Manik
Roman	Pridie Idus Novembres, MMDCCLXXIX AUC
Solar Hijri	4 Azar, SH 1405
Tibetan	16 smin drug, me pho rta 2153 or 1772 or 1000

<<	November					>>
Su	Mo	Tu	We	Th	Fr	Sa
1	2	3	4	5	6	7
8	9	10	11	12	13	14
15	16	17	18	19	20	21
22	23	24	25	26	27	28
29	30
2026

November 25 in recent years
2025 (Tuesday)
2024 (Monday)
2023 (Saturday)
2022 (Friday)
2021 (Thursday)
2020 (Wednesday)
2019 (Monday)
2018 (Sunday)
2017 (Saturday)
2016 (Friday)

November 25 is the 329th day of the year (330th in leap years) in the Gregorian calendar; 36 days remain until the end of the year.

== Events ==
=== Pre-1600 ===
- 571 BC – Servius Tullius, king of Rome, celebrates the first of his three triumphs for his victory over the Etruscans.
- 1034 – Máel Coluim mac Cináeda, King of Scots, dies. His grandson, Donnchad, son of Bethóc and Crínán of Dunkeld, inherits the throne.
- 1120 – The White Ship sinks in the English Channel, drowning William Adelin, son and heir of Henry I of England.
- 1177 – Baldwin IV of Jerusalem and Raynald of Châtillon defeat Saladin at the Battle of Montgisard.
- 1185 – Election of pope Urban III following the death of pope Lucius III.
- 1277 – Election of pope Nicholas III following the death of pope John XXI.
- 1343 – A tsunami, caused by an earthquake in the Tyrrhenian Sea, devastates Naples and the Maritime Republic of Amalfi, among other places.
- 1400 – King Minkhaung I becomes king of Ava.
- 1487 – Elizabeth of York is crowned Queen Consort of England.
- 1491 – The siege of Granada, the last Moorish stronghold in Spain, ends with the Treaty of Granada.
- 1510 – Portuguese conquest of Goa: Portuguese naval forces under the command of Afonso de Albuquerque, and local mercenaries working for privateer Timoji, seize Goa from the Bijapur Sultanate, resulting in 451 years of Portuguese colonial rule.
- 1596 – The Cudgel War begins in Finland (at the time part of Sweden), when peasants rebel against the imposition of taxes by the nobility.

=== 1601–1900 ===
- 1667 – A deadly earthquake rocks Shemakha in the Caucasus, killing 80,000 people.
- 1678 – Trunajaya rebellion: After a long and logistically challenging march, the allied Mataram and Dutch troops successfully assault the rebel stronghold of Kediri.
- 1755 – King Ferdinand VI of Spain grants royal protection to the Beaterio de la Compañia de Jesus, now known as the Congregation of the Religious of the Virgin Mary.
- 1758 – French and Indian War: British forces capture Fort Duquesne from French control. Later, Fort Pitt will be built nearby and grow into modern Pittsburgh.
- 1759 – An earthquake hits the Mediterranean destroying Beirut and Damascus and killing 30,000–40,000.
- 1783 – American Revolutionary War: The last British troops leave New York City, three months after the signing of the Treaty of Paris.
- 1795 – Partitions of Poland: Stanisław August Poniatowski, the last king of independent Poland, is forced to abdicate and is exiled to Russia.
- 1826 – The Greek frigate Hellas arrives in Nafplion to become the first flagship of the Hellenic Navy.
- 1833 – A massive undersea earthquake, estimated magnitude between 8.7 and 9.2, rocks Sumatra, producing a massive tsunami all along the Indonesian coast.
- 1839 – A cyclone slams into south-eastern India. An estimated 300,000 deaths resulted from the disaster.
- 1863 – American Civil War: Battle of Missionary Ridge: Union forces led by General Ulysses S. Grant break the Siege of Chattanooga by routing Confederate troops under General Braxton Bragg at Missionary Ridge in Tennessee.
- 1864 – American Civil War: A group of Confederate operatives calling themselves the Confederate Army of Manhattan starts fires in more than 20 locations in an unsuccessful attempt to burn down New York City.
- 1874 – The United States Greenback Party is established as a political party consisting primarily of farmers affected by the Panic of 1873.
- 1876 – American Indian Wars: In retaliation for the American defeat at the Battle of the Little Bighorn, United States Army troops sack the sleeping village of Cheyenne Chief Dull Knife at the headwaters of the Powder River.

=== 1901–present ===
- 1905 – Prince Carl of Denmark arrives in Norway to become King Haakon VII of Norway.
- 1908 – A fire breaks out on SS Sardinia as it leaves Malta's Grand Harbour, resulting in the ship's grounding and the deaths of at least 118 people.
- 1912 – Românul de la Pind, the longest-running newspaper by and about Aromanians prior to World War II, ceases its publications.
- 1915 – Albert Einstein presents the field equations of general relativity to the Prussian Academy of Sciences.
- 1917 – World War I: German forces defeat Portuguese army of about 1,200 at Negomano on the border of modern-day Mozambique and Tanzania.
- 1918 – Vojvodina, formerly Austro-Hungarian crown land, proclaims its secession from Austria-Hungary to join the Kingdom of Serbia.
- 1926 – The deadliest November tornado outbreak in U.S. history kills 76 people and injures more than 400.
- 1931 – Wilhelm Schäfer leaves the Nazi Party and hands over the Boxheim Documents to the Frankfurt police.
- 1936 – In Berlin, Germany and Japan sign the Anti-Comintern Pact, agreeing to consult on measures "to safeguard their common interests" in the case of an unprovoked attack by the Soviet Union against either nation.
- 1941 – World War II: HMS Barham is sunk by a German torpedo.
- 1943 – World War II: Statehood of Bosnia and Herzegovina is re-established at the State Anti-fascist Council for the National Liberation of Bosnia and Herzegovina.
- 1947 – Red Scare: The "Hollywood Ten" are blacklisted by Hollywood movie studios.
- 1947 – New Zealand ratifies the Statute of Westminster and thus becomes independent of legislative control by the United Kingdom.
- 1950 – The Great Appalachian Storm of 1950 impacts 22 American states, killing 353 people, injuring over 160, and causing US$66.7 million in damages (1950 dollars).
- 1952 – Agatha Christie's murder-mystery play The Mousetrap opens at the Ambassadors Theatre in London's West End after a premiere in Nottingham, UK. It will become the longest continuously running play in history.
- 1952 – Korean War: After 42 days of fighting, the Battle of Triangle Hill ends in a Chinese victory. American and South Korean units abandon their attempt to capture the "Iron Triangle".
- 1958 – French Sudan gains autonomy as a self-governing member of the French Community.
- 1960 – The Mirabal sisters of the Dominican Republic are assassinated.
- 1963 – State funeral of John F. Kennedy; after lying in state at the United States Capitol, a Requiem Mass takes place at Cathedral of St. Matthew the Apostle and the President is buried at Arlington National Cemetery.
- 1968 – The Old Student House in Helsinki, Finland is occupied by a large group of University of Helsinki students.
- 1970 – In Japan, author Yukio Mishima and one compatriot commit ritualistic seppuku after an unsuccessful coup attempt.
- 1973 – Georgios Papadopoulos, head of the military Regime of the Colonels in Greece, is ousted in a hardliners' coup led by Brigadier General Dimitrios Ioannidis.
- 1975 – Coup of 25 November 1975, a failed military coup d'état by Portuguese far-left activists seeking to hijack the Portuguese transition to democracy to establish a communist regime.
- 1975 – Suriname gains independence from the Netherlands.
- 1977 – Former Senator Benigno Aquino Jr., is found guilty by the Philippine Military Commission No. 2 and is sentenced to death by firing squad. He is later assassinated in 1983.
- 1980 – Sangoulé Lamizana, president of Upper Volta, is ousted from power in a coup d'état led by Colonel Saye Zerbo.
- 1981 – Pope John Paul II appoints Joseph Cardinal Ratzinger (the future Pope Benedict XVI) Prefect of the Congregation for the Doctrine of the Faith.
- 1984 – Thirty-six top musicians gather in a Notting Hill studio and record Band Aid's "Do They Know It's Christmas?" in order to raise money for famine relief in Ethiopia.
- 1985 – A Soviet Air Force Antonov An-12 is shot down near Menongue in Angola's Cuando Cubango Province, killing 21.
- 1986 – Iran–Contra affair: U.S. Attorney General Edwin Meese announces that profits from covert weapons sales to Iran were illegally diverted to the anti-communist Contra rebels in Nicaragua.
- 1986 – The King Fahd Causeway is officially opened in the Persian Gulf.
- 1987 – Typhoon Nina pummels the Philippines with category 5 winds of 265 km/h (165 mph) and a surge that destroys entire villages. At least 1,036 deaths are attributed to the storm.
- 1992 – The Federal Assembly of Czechoslovakia votes to split the country into the Czech Republic and Slovakia, with effect from January 1, 1993.
- 1999 – A five-year-old Cuban boy, Elián González, is rescued by fishermen while floating in an inner tube off the Florida coast.
- 2000 – The 2000 Baku earthquake, with a Richter magnitude of 7.0 kills 26 people dead in Baku, Azerbaijan, being the strongest earthquake in the region in 158 years.
- 2008 – Cyclone Nisha strikes northern Sri Lanka, killing 15 people and displacing 90,000 others while dealing the region the highest rainfall in nine decades.
- 2009 – Jeddah floods: Freak rains swamp the city of Jeddah, Saudi Arabia, during an ongoing Hajj pilgrimage. Three thousand cars are swept away and 122 people perish in the torrents, with 350 others missing.

== Births ==
=== Pre-1600 ===
- 902 – Emperor Taizong of Liao (died 947)
- 1075 – Emperor Taizong of Jin (died 1135)
- 1454 – Catherine Cornaro, Queen of Cyprus (died 1510)
- 1467 – Thomas Dacre, 2nd Baron Dacre, Knight of Henry VIII of England (died 1525)
- 1493 – Osanna of Cattaro, Dominican visionary and anchoress (died 1565)
- 1562 – Lope de Vega, Spanish playwright and poet (died 1635)
- 1566 – John Heminges, English actor (died 1630)
- 1577 – Piet Pieterszoon Hein, Dutch admiral (died 1629)
- 1587 – Sir Gervase Clifton, 1st Baronet, English politician (died 1666)

=== 1601–1900 ===
- 1609 – Henrietta Maria of France, Queen Consort of England, Scotland and Ireland (died 1669)
- 1638 – Catherine of Braganza, Queen Consort of England, Scotland and Ireland (died 1705)
- 1666 – Giuseppe Giovanni Battista Guarneri, Italian violin maker (died 1740)
- 1703 – Jean-François Séguier, French astronomer and botanist (died 1784)
- 1752 – Johann Friedrich Reichardt, German composer and critic (died 1814)
- 1753 – Robert Townsend, American spy (died 1838)
- 1758 – John Armstrong, Jr., American general and politician, 7th United States Secretary of War (died 1843)
- 1778 – Mary Anne Schimmelpenninck, English author and activist (died 1856)
- 1787 – Franz Xaver Gruber, Austrian organist and composer (died 1863)
- 1814 – Julius Robert von Mayer, German physician and physicist (died 1878)
- 1815 – William Sawyer, Canadian merchant and politician (died 1904)
- 1817 – John Bigelow, American lawyer and politician, United States Ambassador to France (died 1911)
- 1835 – Andrew Carnegie, Scottish-American businessman and philanthropist (died 1919)
- 1841 – Ernst Schröder, German mathematician and academic (died 1902)
- 1843 – Henry Ware Eliot, American businessman and philanthropist (died 1919)
- 1844 – Karl Benz, German engineer and businessman, founded Mercedes-Benz (died 1929)
- 1845 – José Maria de Eça de Queirós, Portuguese-French journalist and author (died 1900)
- 1846 – Carrie Nation, American activist (died 1911)
- 1858 – Alfred Capus, French journalist, author, and playwright (died 1922)
- 1862 – Ethelbert Nevin, American pianist and composer (died 1901)
- 1862 – Gustaf Söderström, Swedish tug of war competitor, shot putter, and discus thrower (died 1958)
- 1865 – Kate Gleason, American engineer, businesswoman, and philanthropist (died 1933)
- 1867 – Talaat Harb, Egyptian economist, founded the Banque Misr (died 1941)
- 1868 – Ernest Louis, Grand Duke of Hesse (died 1937)
- 1869 – Ben Lindsey, American lawyer and judge (died 1934)
- 1870 – Winthrop Ames, American director, producer, and playwright (died 1937)
- 1870 – Maurice Denis, French painter of Les Nabis movement (died 1943)
- 1872 – Robert Maysack, American gymnast and triathlete (died 1960)
- 1873 – Albert Henry Krehbiel, American painter and illustrator (died 1945)
- 1874 – Joe Gans, American boxer (died 1910)
- 1876 – Princess Victoria Melita of Saxe-Coburg and Gotha (died 1936)
- 1877 – Harley Granville-Barker, British actor, director and playwright (died 1946)
- 1880 – John Flynn, Australian minister and pilot, founded the Royal Flying Doctor Service (died 1951)
- 1880 – Elsie J. Oxenham, English author (died 1960)
- 1881 – Jacob Fichman, Romanian-Israeli poet and critic (died 1958)
- 1881 – Pope John XXIII (died 1963)
- 1883 – Harvey Spencer Lewis, American mystic and author (died 1939)
- 1887 – Nikolai Vavilov, Russian botanist and geneticist (died 1943)
- 1889 – Reşat Nuri Güntekin, Turkish author and playwright (died 1956)
- 1890 – Isaac Rosenberg, English soldier and poet (died 1918)
- 1891 – Ōnishiki Uichirō, Japanese sumo wrestler, the 26th Yokozuna (died 1941)
- 1893 – Joseph Wood Krutch, American author and critic (died 1970)
- 1895 – Wilhelm Kempff, German pianist and composer (died 1991)
- 1895 – Anastas Mikoyan, Soviet politician, Chairman of the Presidium of the Supreme Soviet of the Soviet Union (died 1978)
- 1895 – Helen Hooven Santmyer, American poet and author (died 1986)
- 1895 – Ludvík Svoboda, Czech general and politician, 8th President of Czechoslovakia (died 1979)
- 1896 – Albertus Soegijapranata, Indonesian archbishop (died 1963)
- 1896 – Virgil Thomson, American composer and critic (died 1989)
- 1898 – Debaki Bose, Indian actor, director, and screenwriter (died 1971)
- 1898 – Aarne Viisimaa, Estonian tenor and director (died 1989)
- 1900 – Rudolf Höss, German SS officer, commandant of Auschwitz, convicted war criminal (died 1947)
- 1900 – Helen Gahagan Douglas, American actress and politician (died 1980)

=== 1901–present ===
- 1901 – Arthur Liebehenschel, German SS officer, commandant of Auschwitz and later Majdanek, convicted war criminal (died 1948)
- 1902 – Eddie Shore, Canadian-American ice hockey player and coach (died 1985)
- 1904 – Lillian Copeland, American discus thrower and shot putter (died 1964)
- 1904 – Toni Ortelli, Italian composer and conductor (died 2000)
- 1905 – Samiha Ayverdi, Turkish mystic and author (died 1993)
- 1906 – Alice Ambrose, American philosopher and logician (died 2001)
- 1907 – John Stuart Hindmarsh, English race car driver and pilot (died 1938)
- 1908 – Natyaguru Nurul Momen, Bangladeshi playwright, author, educator, director and media personality (died 1990)
- 1909 – P. D. Eastman, American author and illustrator (died 1986)
- 1911 – Roelof Frankot, Dutch painter and photographer (died 1984)
- 1913 – Lewis Thomas, American physician, etymologist, and educator (died 1993)
- 1914 – Joe DiMaggio, American baseball player and coach (died 1999)
- 1914 – Léon Zitrone, Russian-French journalist (died 1995)
- 1915 – Augusto Pinochet, Chilean general and politician, 30th President of Chile (died 2006)
- 1915 – Armando Villanueva, Peruvian politician, 121st Prime Minister of Peru (died 2013)
- 1916 – Peg Lynch, American actress and screenwriter (died 2015)
- 1917 – Luigi Poggi, Italian cardinal (died 2010)
- 1917 – Alparslan Türkeş, Cypriot-Turkish colonel and politician, Deputy Prime Minister of Turkey (died 1997)
- 1919 – Norman Tokar, American director, producer, and screenwriter (died 1979)
- 1920 – Shelagh Fraser, English actress (died 2000)
- 1920 – Ricardo Montalbán, Mexican-American actor, singer, and director (died 2009)
- 1920 – Noel Neill, American actress (died 2016)
- 1922 – Ilja Hurník, Czech composer and playwright (died 2013)
- 1923 – Mauno Koivisto, Finnish banker and politician, 9th President of Finland (died 2017)
- 1923 – Art Wall Jr., American golfer (died 2001)
- 1924 – Paul Desmond, American saxophonist and composer (died 1977)
- 1924 – Sybil Stockdale, American activist, co-founded the National League of Families (died 2015)
- 1924 – Takaaki Yoshimoto, Japanese poet, philosopher, and critic (died 2012)
- 1926 – Poul Anderson, American author (died 2001)
- 1926 – Jeffrey Hunter, American actor and producer (died 1969)
- 1926 – Ranganath Misra, Indian lawyer and jurist, 21st Chief Justice of India (died 2012)
- 1929 – Judy Crichton, American director and producer (died 2007)
- 1931 – Nat Adderley, American cornet and trumpet player (died 2000)
- 1933 – Kathryn Crosby, American actress and singer (died 2024)
- 1935 – Robert Berner, American geologist and academic (died 2015)
- 1936 – Trisha Brown, American dancer and choreographer (died 2017)
- 1938 – Erol Güngör, Turkish sociologist and psychologist (died 1983)
- 1938 – Rosanna Schiaffino, Italian actress (died 2009)
- 1939 – Martin Feldstein, American economist and academic (died 2019)
- 1940 – Reinhard Furrer, Austrian-German physicist and astronaut (died 1995)
- 1940 – Joe Gibbs, American football coach and auto racing executive
- 1940 – Karl Offmann, Mauritian politician, 3rd President of Mauritius (died 2022)
- 1940 – Shyamal Kumar Sen, Indian jurist and politician, 21st Governor of West Bengal
- 1940 – Percy Sledge, American singer (died 2015)
- 1941 – Christos Papanikolaou, Greek pole vaulter
- 1941 – Riaz Ahmed Gohar Shahi, Pakistani spiritual leader and author
- 1942 – Naomi Stadlen was a British therapist and writer (died 2025)
- 1942 – Bob Lind, American singer-songwriter and guitarist
- 1942 – Mimis Papaioannou, Greek footballer and manager (died 2023)
- 1943 – Jerry Portnoy, American singer-songwriter and harmonica player
- 1944 – Ben Stein, American actor, television personality, game show host, lawyer, and author
- 1944 – Michael Kijana Wamalwa, Kenyan lawyer and politician, 8th Vice President of Kenya (died 2003)
- 1945 – Gail Collins, American journalist and author
- 1946 – Mike Doyle, English footballer (died 2011)
- 1947 – Jonathan Kaplan, French-American director and producer (died 2025)
- 1947 – John Larroquette, American actor
- 1948 – Jacques Dupuis, Canadian lawyer and politician, 14th Deputy Premier of Quebec
- 1949 – Kerry O'Keeffe, Australian cricketer and sportscaster
- 1950 – Chris Claremont, English-American author
- 1950 – Giorgio Faletti, Italian author, screenwriter, and actor (died 2014)
- 1950 – Alexis Wright, Australian author
- 1951 – Charlaine Harris, American author and poet
- 1951 – Bill Morrissey, American singer-songwriter (died 2011)
- 1951 – Arturo Pérez-Reverte, Spanish author and journalist
- 1951 – Johnny Rep, Dutch footballer and manager
- 1952 – John Lynch, American businessman and politician, 80th Governor of New Hampshire
- 1952 – Gabriele Oriali, Italian footballer and manager
- 1953 – Graham Eadie, Australian rugby league player and coach
- 1953 – Mark Frost, American author, screenwriter, and producer
- 1953 – Jeffrey Skilling, American businessman
- 1955 – Don Hahn, American director and producer
- 1955 – Kurt Niedermayer, German footballer and manager
- 1955 – Connie Palmen, Dutch author
- 1955 – Bruno Tonioli, Italian dancer and choreographer
- 1957 – Bob Ehrlich, American lawyer and politician, 60th Governor of Maryland
- 1958 – Naomi Oreskes, American historian of science
- 1959 – Charles Kennedy, Scottish journalist and politician (died 2015)
- 1960 – Amy Grant, American singer-songwriter
- 1960 – John F. Kennedy Jr., American lawyer, journalist, and publisher (died 1999)
- 1961 – Tarzan Basaruddin, Indonesian professor of computer science
- 1962 – Gilbert Delorme, Canadian ice hockey player and coach
- 1962 – Hironobu Sakaguchi, Japanese videogame designer
- 1963 – Kevin Chamberlin, American actor and director
- 1963 – Holly Cole, Canadian singer and actress
- 1963 – Chip Kelly, American football player and coach
- 1964 – Mark Lanegan, American singer-songwriter (died 2022)
- 1965 – Cris Carter, American football player, coach, and sportscaster
- 1966 – Billy Burke, American actor
- 1966 – Stacy Lattisaw, American R&B singer
- 1967 – Anthony Nesty, Surinamese swimmer
- 1967 – Gregg Turkington, Australian comedian and singer
- 1968 – Jill Hennessy, Canadian actress and singer
- 1968 – Erick Sermon, American rapper and producer
- 1969 – Anthony Peeler, American basketball player
- 1971 – Christina Applegate, American actress
- 1971 – Magnus Arvedson, Swedish ice hockey player and coach
- 1971 – Göksel Demirpençe, Turkish singer-songwriter
- 1972 – Gerard King, American basketball player
- 1972 – Deepa Marathe, Indian cricketer
- 1972 – Petteri Nummelin, Finnish ice hockey player
- 1973 – Steven de Jongh, Dutch cyclist
- 1973 – Octavio Dotel, Dominican baseball player
- 1973 – Eddie Steeples, American actor, producer, and screenwriter
- 1974 – Kenneth Mitchell, Canadian actor (died 2024)
- 1975 – Kristian Nairn, Northern Irish actor and DJ
- 1976 – Clint Mathis, American soccer player and coach
- 1976 – Donovan McNabb, American football player and sportscaster
- 1976 – Olena Vitrychenko, Ukrainian gymnast and coach
- 1977 – Guillermo Cañas, Argentinian tennis player
- 1977 – Jill Flint, American actress
- 1977 – Marcus Marshall, Australian racing driver
- 1978 – Ringo Sheena, Japanese singer-songwriter and producer
- 1979 – Jerry Ferrara, American actor
- 1979 – Joel Kinnaman, Swedish actor
- 1980 – John-Michael Liles, American ice hockey player
- 1980 – Aaron Mokoena, South African footballer
- 1980 – Alviro Petersen, South African cricketer
- 1980 – Nick Swisher, American baseball player
- 1980 – Steffen Thier, German rugby player
- 1981 – Xabi Alonso, Spanish footballer
- 1981 – Lee Bum-ho, South Korean baseball player
- 1981 – Barbara Pierce Bush, American activist
- 1981 – Jenna Bush Hager, American journalist
- 1981 – Jared Jeffries, American basketball player
- 1982 – Michael Garnett, Canadian ice hockey player
- 1983 – Jhulan Goswami, Indian cricketer
- 1984 – Peter Siddle, Australian cricketer
- 1984 – Gaspard Ulliel, French actor (died 2022)
- 1985 – Remona Fransen, Dutch pentathlete
- 1986 – Katie Cassidy, American actress
- 1987 – Trevor Booker, American basketball player
- 1988 – Nodar Kumaritashvili, Georgian luger (died 2010)
- 1988 – Jay Spearing, English footballer
- 1990 – Stephanie Hsu, American actress
- 1991 – Philipp Grubauer, German ice hockey player
- 1992 – Ana Bogdan, Romanian tennis player
- 1993 – Danny Kent, English motorcycle racer
- 1997 – Dennis Smith Jr., American basketball player
- 2000 – Talen Horton-Tucker, American basketball player
- 2000 – Kaja Juvan, Slovenian tennis player
- 2002 – Pedri, Spanish footballer

== Deaths ==
=== Pre-1600 ===
- 311 – Pope Peter I of Alexandria
- 734 – Bilge Khagan, Turkic emperor (born 683)
- 1034 – Malcolm II of Scotland (born 954)
- 1120 – William Adelin, son of Henry I of England (sinking of the White Ship) (born 1103)
- 1185 – Pope Lucius III (born 1097)
- 1326 – Prince Koreyasu, Japanese shōgun (born 1264)
- 1374 – Philip II, Prince of Taranto (born 1329)
- 1456 – Jacques Cœur, French merchant and banker (born 1395)
- 1560 – Andrea Doria, Italian admiral (born 1466)
- 1565 – Hu Zongxian, Chinese general (born 1512)

=== 1601–1900 ===
- 1626 – Edward Alleyn, English actor, founded Dulwich College (born 1566)
- 1694 – Ismaël Bullialdus, French astronomer and mathematician (born 1605)
- 1700 – Stephanus Van Cortlandt, American lawyer and politician, 10th Mayor of New York City (born 1643)
- 1748 – Isaac Watts, English hymnwriter and theologian (born 1674)
- 1755 – Johann Georg Pisendel, German violinist and composer (born 1687)
- 1785 – Richard Glover, English poet and politician (born 1712)
- 1865 – Heinrich Barth, German explorer and scholar (born 1821)
- 1884 – Hermann Kolbe, German chemist and academic (born 1818)
- 1885 – Thomas A. Hendricks, American lawyer and politician, 21st Vice President of the United States (born 1819)
- 1885 – Alfonso XII of Spain (born 1857)

=== 1901–present ===
- 1909 – Edward P. Allen, American lawyer and politician (born 1839)
- 1920 – Gaston Chevrolet, French-American racing driver and businessman (born 1892)
- 1934 – N. E. Brown, English plant taxonomist and authority on succulents (born 1849)
- 1944 – Kenesaw Mountain Landis, American lawyer and judge (born 1866)
- 1948 – Kanbun Uechi, Japanese martial artist, founded Uechi-ryū (born 1877)
- 1949 – Bill Robinson, American actor and dancer (born 1878)
- 1950 – Mao Anying, Chinese general (born 1922)
- 1950 – Johannes V. Jensen, Danish author and playwright, Nobel Prize laureate (born 1873)
- 1950 – Gustaf John Ramstedt, Finnish linguist and diplomat (born 1873)
- 1956 – Alexander Dovzhenko, Ukrainian-Russian director, producer, and screenwriter (born 1894)
- 1957 – Prince George of Greece and Denmark (born 1869)
- 1959 – Gérard Philipe, French actor (born 1922)
- 1961 – Hubert Van Innis, Belgian archer (born 1866)
- 1963 – Alexander Marinesko, Russian lieutenant (born 1913)
- 1965 – Myra Hess, English pianist and educator (born 1890)
- 1968 – Upton Sinclair, American novelist, critic, and essayist (born 1878)
- 1968 – Paul Siple, American geographer and explorer (born 1908)
- 1970 – Yukio Mishima, Japanese author, actor, and director (born 1925)
- 1972 – Henri Coandă, Romanian engineer, designed the Coandă-1910 (born 1886)
- 1972 – Hans Scharoun, German architect (born 1893)
- 1973 – Laurence Harvey, Lithuania-born English actor (born 1928)
- 1974 – Nick Drake, English singer-songwriter and guitarist (born 1948)
- 1974 – U Thant, Burmese lawyer and diplomat, 3rd Secretary-General of the United Nations (born 1909)
- 1980 – Herbert Flam, American tennis player (born 1928)
- 1981 – Jack Albertson, American actor and singer (born 1907)
- 1983 – Saleem Raza (Pakistani singer), Pakistani Christian playback singer (born 1932)
- 1984 – Yashwantrao Chavan, Indian lawyer and politician, 5th Deputy Prime Minister of India (born 1913)
- 1985 – Geoffrey Grigson, English poet and critic (born 1905)
- 1985 – Franz Hildebrandt, German pastor and theologian (born 1909)
- 1987 – Harold Washington, American lawyer and politician, 51st Mayor of Chicago (born 1922)
- 1989 – Alva R. Fitch, American general (born 1907)
- 1990 – Merab Mamardashvili, Georgian philosopher and academic (born 1930)
- 1991 – Eleanor Audley, American actress and voice artist (born 1905)
- 1995 – Léon Zitrone, Russian-French journalist (born 1914)
- 1997 – Hastings Banda, Malawian physician and politician, 1st President of Malawi (born 1898)
- 1998 – Nelson Goodman, American philosopher and academic (born 1906)
- 1998 – Flip Wilson, American comedian, actor, and screenwriter (born 1933)
- 1999 – Valentín Campa, Mexican union leader and politician (born 1904)
- 2000 – Hugh Alexander, American baseball player and scout (born 1917)
- 2002 – Karel Reisz, Czech-English director and producer (born 1926)
- 2004 – Ed Paschke, American painter and academic (born 1939)
- 2005 – George Best, Northern Irish footballer (born 1946)
- 2005 – Richard Burns, English rally driver (born 1971)
- 2006 – Luciano Bottaro, Italian author and illustrator (born 1931)
- 2006 – Valentín Elizalde, Mexican singer-songwriter (born 1979)
- 2006 – Phyllis Fraser, American actress and publisher, co-founded Beginner Books (born 1916)
- 2006 – Kenneth M. Taylor, American lieutenant and pilot (born 1919)
- 2007 – Peter Lipton, American philosopher and academic (born 1954)
- 2008 – Leonard Goodwin, British protozoologist (born 1915)
- 2010 – Alfred Balk, American journalist and author (born 1930)
- 2010 – Peter Christopherson, English keyboard player, songwriter, and director (born 1955)
- 2010 – C. Scott Littleton, American anthropologist and academic (born 1933)
- 2010 – Bernard Matthews, English businessman, founded Bernard Matthews Farms (born 1930)
- 2011 – Vasily Alekseyev, Russian weightlifter and coach (born 1942)
- 2011 – Coco Robicheaux, American singer-songwriter and guitarist (born 1947)
- 2011 – Jawayd Anwar, Pakistani poet and writer (born 1959)
- 2012 – Lars Hörmander, Swedish mathematician and educator (born 1931)
- 2012 – Dave Sexton, English footballer and manager (born 1930)
- 2012 – Dinah Sheridan, English actress (born 1920)
- 2012 – Jim Temp, American football player and businessman (born 1933)
- 2013 – Lou Brissie, American baseball player (born 1924)
- 2013 – Ricardo Fort, Argentinian businessman (born 1968)
- 2013 – Bill Foulkes, English footballer and manager (born 1932)
- 2013 – Chico Hamilton, American drummer and bandleader (born 1921)
- 2013 – Egon Lánský, Czech journalist and politician (born 1934)
- 2013 – Al Plastino, American author and illustrator (born 1921)
- 2014 – Irvin J. Borowsky, American publisher and philanthropist (born 1924)
- 2014 – Sitara Devi, Indian dancer, and choreographer (born 1920)
- 2014 – Petr Hapka, Czech composer and conductor (born 1944)
- 2014 – Denham Harman, American biogerontologist and academic (born 1916)
- 2015 – O'Neil Bell, Jamaican boxer (born 1974)
- 2015 – Jeremy Black, English admiral (born 1932)
- 2015 – Svein Christiansen, Norwegian drummer and composer (born 1941)
- 2015 – Lennart Hellsing, Swedish author and translator (born 1919)
- 2015 – Elmo Williams, American director, producer, and editor (born 1913)
- 2016 – Fidel Castro, Communist leader of Cuba, and revolutionary (born 1926)
- 2016 – Ron Glass, American actor (born 1945)
- 2020 – Diego Maradona, Argentinian football player (born 1960)
- 2023 – Terry Venables, English football player and manager (born1943)
- 2024 – Earl Holliman, American actor (born 1928)
- 2024 – Hal Lindsey, American evangelist and Christian writer (born 1929)
- 2025 – Bernardo Álvarez Afonso, Spanish Roman Catholic bishop (born 1949)

== Holidays and observances ==
- Christian feast day:
  - Beatrice of Ornacieux
  - Catherine of Alexandria and its related observances
  - Elizabeth of Reute
  - Isaac Watts (Lutheran Church and Church of England)
  - James Otis Sargent Huntington (Episcopal Church)
  - Marculus of Thamugadi
  - Peter I of Alexandria
  - November 25 (Eastern Orthodox liturgics)
- International Day for the Elimination of Violence against Women
- Roses Revolution Day, against obstetric violence
