= Naomi Stadlen =

- Born: Naomi Jacoby; 25 November 1942; London
- Died: 6 June 2025 (aged 82)
- Education: Goldsmiths, University of London
- Alma mater: University of Sussex
- Occupation: Writer
- Known for: writing about motherhood

Naomi Stadlen (born Naomi Jacoby; November 25, 1942 – June 6, 2025) was a British therapist and writer. She was known for writing What Mothers Do: Especially When it Looks Like Nothing.

== Early life and education ==
Stadlen was born in 1942 in London. When she was two, her father, Hans, died. Her parents were Jewish graphologists who had escaped from Germany before the war. Her mother, Marianne (born Goldschmidt), had just given birth to her younger brother when she became a single parent. Her mother later became a Jungian analyst. Stadlen studied at North London Collegiate school and the University of Sussex, and then trained at Goldsmiths as a psychoanalytic counsellor. However she worked mainly as a book editor, a social worker and a supervisor of post-graduate students seeking to master's and PhD qualifications, which were awarded by Middlesex University.

== Career ==
In 1997, she began leading a module at the New School of Psychotherapy and Counselling, the existential-therapy-based school founded by Emmy van Deurzen. Stadlen was a visiting lecturer for the module she designed, titled "Families and Family Systems". During one session, the idea of What Mothers Do: Especially When it Looks Like Nothing was mentioned, which inspired her to write the book.

What Mothers Do: Especially When it Looks Like Nothing was published in 2004 and was described as "the best parenting book you've never heard of". The book drew on Stadlen's own experience, and she took pride in never offering specific advice. She explored the transition of a woman into a mother and the invaluable contribution that can appear to observers as "nothing".

== Personal life ==
Stadlen was brought up by her mother. In 1968, she met Anthony Stadlen. They married and had three children. Stadlen later stated that she then realised the importance of fathers.

== Death ==
She died in June 2025. Her fifth and final book, A Grand Quarrel: Elizabeth Gaskell, Florence Nightingale and Mothers Today, was published later in the same month.

== Works ==
- What Mothers Do: Especially When it Looks Like Nothing, 2004
- How Mothers Love: And how relationships are born, 2011
- What Mothers Learn: Without Being Taught, 2020
- Why Grandmothers Matter, 2023
- A Grand Quarrel: Elizabeth Gaskell, Florence Nightingale and Mothers Today, 2025
