= Cognitive analytic therapy =

Form of psychological therapy

Cognitive analytic therapy (CAT) is a form of psychological therapy initially developed in the United Kingdom by Anthony Ryle. This time-limited therapy was developed in the context of the UK's National Health Service with the aim of providing effective and affordable psychological treatment which could be realistically provided in a resource constrained public health system. It is distinctive due to its intensive use of reformulation, its integration of cognitive and analytic practice and its collaborative nature, involving the patient very actively in their treatment.

The CAT practitioner aims to work with the patient to identify procedural sequences; chains of events, thoughts, emotions and motivations that explain how a target problem (for example self-harm) is established and maintained. In addition to the procedural sequence model, a second distinguishing feature of CAT is the use of reciprocal roles (RRs). These identify problems as occurring between people and not within the patient. RRs may be set up in early life and then be replayed in later life; for example someone who as a child felt neglected by parents perceived as abandoning might be vulnerable to feelings of abandonment in later life (or indeed neglect themselves).

== Sources and origins ==
As the name implies, cognitive analytic therapy (CAT) evolved as an integrative therapy based on ideas from cognitive and analytic therapies. CAT was also influenced in part by George Kelly's constructivism. Kelly had developed personal construct theory and the repertory grid method, and Kelly's approach to therapy "offered a model of nonauthoritarian practice" that psychotherapist Anthony Ryle found appealing.

Ryle, a general practitioner and analytically trained psychotherapist, was undertaking research into psychotherapy practice using repertory grids in the 1970s. He found that the themes eventually addressed in analytic work were in fact present in transcripts from the very first sessions. However the slow, exploratory nature of traditional analytic therapy meant that these were not always addressed early and assertively, with the result that therapy, while effective, took a long time to produce results. In a 1979 paper, he proposed a shorter, more active form of therapy which integrated elements from cognitive therapy practice (such as goal setting and Socratic questioning) into analytic practice. This would include explicitly formulating the problems experienced by the patient, and sharing this formulation with the patient to engage them in psychotherapy as a co-operative enterprise.

Subsequently, CAT has been influenced by ideas from the work of Soviet psychologist Lev Vygotsky and Russian philosopher Mikhail Bakhtin. From Vygotsky come concepts such as the zone of proximal development (ZPD) and scaffolding. The ZPD implies that new tasks set for the patient (for example, tolerating anxiety about social situations) should extend what they do beyond their current capabilities, but only by a small and achievable amount. Scaffolding involves the therapist providing support for the patient's efforts to change, but varying this level of support as the patient's needs change.

Bakhtin provided concepts such as dialogism from which come techniques such as Dialogical Sequence Analysis. This is a structured attempt to identify and visually display sequences of behaviour, thinking, and emotions so that the patient becomes more aware of these and can start to modify them.

== In practice ==
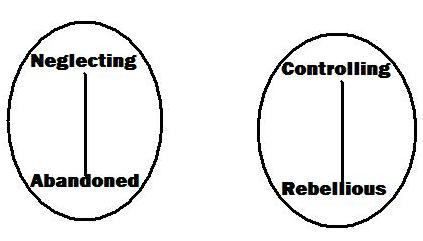
An example of two different reciprocal roles which might be identified during the reformulation phase of CAT.

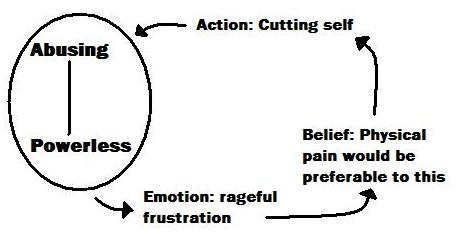
A procedural diagram which might be drawn during the recognition phase of CAT.

The model emphasises collaborative work with the client, and focuses on the understanding of the patterns of maladaptive behaviours. The aim of the therapy is to enable the client to recognise these patterns, understand their origins, and subsequently to learn alternative strategies in order to cope better.

The approach is always time-limited, typically taking place over 8–24 weekly sessions (the precise number being agreed at the start of therapy). Sixteen sessions is probably the most common length. In the first quarter of the therapy (the Reformulation phase) the therapist collects all the relevant information, asking the patient about present day problems and also earlier life experiences. At that point the therapist writes a reformulation letter to the client. This letter summarises the therapist's understanding of the client's problems. Particular attention is given to understanding the connection between childhood patterns of behaviour and their impact on adult life. The letter is agreed between patient and therapist and forms the basis for the rest of the work.

After the reformulation letter the patient may be asked to complete diaries or rating sheets to record the occurrence of problems and their context. During this period (known as the Recognition phase) patient and therapist construct a diagrammatic formulation to illustrate the unhelpful procedures which maintain problems for the patient. The aim of this phase is to enable the patient to recognise when and how problems occur.

In the second half of the therapy work moves into the Revision phase, where patient and therapist identify and practice "exits" from the procedural diagram established in the previous phase. For example, a problematic procedure might move a patient from feeling angry to taking an overdose. An exit might involve expressing the anger in some way as an alternative to self-injuring behaviour.

At the end of the therapy, patient and therapist each write "goodbye letters" which they exchange, summarising what has been achieved in the therapy and what remains to be done. After the end of the agreed number of weekly sessions, planned follow-up sessions take place to monitor and support the changes that have been made. Typically, a 16-session CAT might be followed up by a single session one month after the end of therapy, and a final one three months later.

== Evidence base ==
CAT has been the subject of a number of research studies published in peer-reviewed journals. These include randomised controlled trials (RCTs) and other kinds of study. The approach is too new for any systematic reviews of RCTs to have been conducted, and therefore is not yet explicitly recommended by name by the UK National Institute for Health and Clinical Excellence (NICE). However NICE has recommended that there should be further research of CAT, for example in borderline personality disorder. A review of CAT research evidence published in 2014 reported that although there were five randomised controlled trials published, research evidence into the approach was dominated by small-scale, practice-based studies. These tended to be with complex and severe clinical groups; 44% of studies reviewed involved personality disorder. A review of CAT looking back over the 30 years to its beginnings contains a meta-analysis of 11 outcome studies of CAT. The overall number of patients treated in the studies was 324 and the average effect size across all studies was 0.83 (95% confidence interval 0.66–1.00). This is a large effect and suggests that CAT is efficacious in treating mental health problems.

=== Evidence from randomised controlled trials ===
CAT has been shown to lead to subjective improvement in people with anorexia nervosa. It has also been shown to produce significant improvements in adolescents with a diagnosis of borderline personality disorder. A different trial suggested that CAT for adult patients with personality disorders also showed improvements in symptoms and interpersonal functioning, as against controls who deteriorated on these measures. CAT has also been shown to improve patients' management of diabetes. An RCT of the use of a CAT-informed assessment for young people who had self-harmed suggested that it was effective in increasing rates of attendance at community follow-up.

=== Evidence from other methodologies ===
Comparative studies have suggested CAT to be at least as effective as other forms of brief psychotherapy, person-centred therapy and cognitive behavioural therapy, and interpersonal psychotherapy.

Case series and single case studies have also been published describing the use of CAT in:

- Depression
- Dissociative psychosis
- The treatment of offenders
- Brain injury
- Deliberate self-harm
- Dissociative identity disorder
- Histrionic personality disorder
- Panic disorder
- Psychological problems in multiple sclerosis
- With carers of people with dementia
- Morbid jealousy
- Borderline personality disorder
- Paranoid personality disorder
- Survivors of child sexual abuse

== Training and Accreditation ==
Training in the UK is organised via ACAT which is also the accrediting organisation and an organisational member of UKCP.
