= Emmy van Deurzen =

Dutch existential therapist (born 1951)

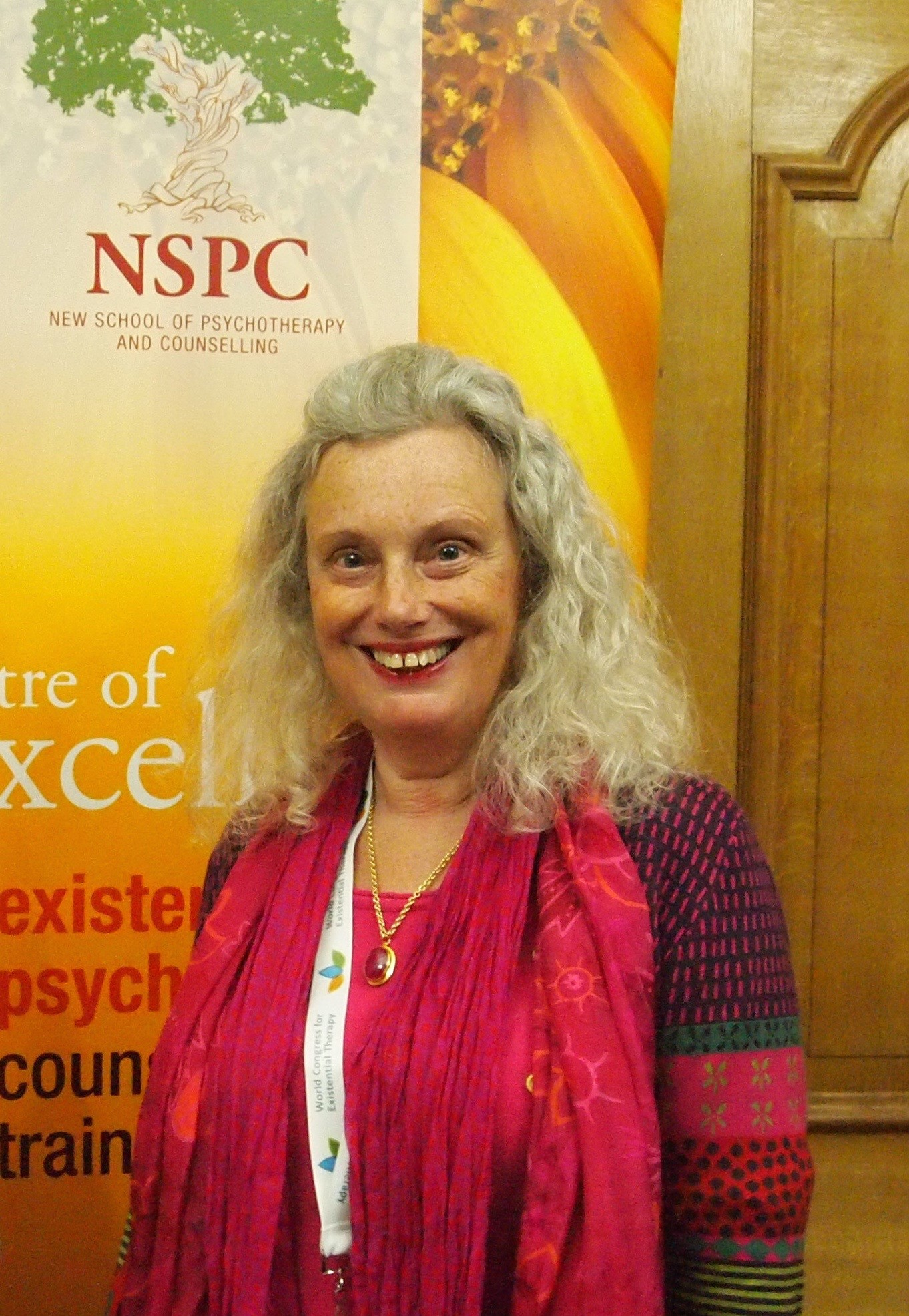
- Born: 13 December 1951 (age 74); The Hague, Netherlands
- Occupations: Existential therapist philosopher author

Emmy van Deurzen (born 13 December 1951) is an existential therapist, psychologist, philosopher, and author who works in the United Kingdom and who has been instrumental in developing existential therapy worldwide. She developed a philosophical therapy based in existential-phenomenology, which was detailed in her many publications, and taught in the organizations she founded.

Van Deurzen was the founder of the Society for Existential Analysis in 1988 and initiated the first World Congress for Existential Therapy in 2015, which also led to the founding of the Federation for Existential Therapy in Europe. She co-founded the School of Psychotherapy and Counselling at Regent's University in 1990, the New School of Psychotherapy and Counselling in 1996, Dilemma Consultancy in 2000 and the Existential Academy in 2010. She was the founder and first president of the worldwide Existential Movement. She established a philosophical therapy based in existential-phenomenology and her twenty plus books have been translated into more than two dozen languages.

== Early life and education ==
Van Deurzen was born on 13 December 1951 in The Hague, Netherlands, Her parents were Arie van Deurzen and Anna Hensel. Her father was an antiques expert and auctioneer who was appointed director of the Antiques Auction House of the Notaries of The Hague when she was an adolescent. She has an older sister Ingrid who became a physiotherapist. They were both raised in The Hague, and lived in a small flat near the North Sea, at the south-west of the city of The Hague.

Van Deurzen completed her classical education at the Dalton Lyceum in The Hague, between 1964 and 1970, completing her Gymnasium Alpha, with final exams in Greek, Latin, Dutch, English, French, German, history and algebra. She was an active member of the school community and published poetry in the school newsletter, took small parts in school plays and sang soprano in the choir, as well as performing songs of her own composition at various school events, with her guitar.

Van Deurzen moved to France to study French and earned a Diplôme Supérieur d'Etudes Françaises, at the University of Montpellier, France. She then went on to study for a licence and a maîtrise in philosophy at the University of Montpellier, where her masters dissertation was supervised by phenomenologist Michel Henry. She wrote her thesis on phenomenology and psychiatry in relation to solitude and solipsism for her philosophy dissertation. After this, she completed a second licence, this time in psychology, followed by a master's degree in clinical psychology at the University of Bordeaux, where she was invited to work as an assistant and tutor in the psychophysiology lab. She did clinical research for her final dissertation with young women who had attempted suicide for her clinical psychology thesis. Van Deurzen did her PhD on Heidegger's concepts of authenticity and inauthenticity and their relevance to psychotherapy, at City University, London under supervision with Alfons Grieder, from 1990 to 2000. This was on the theme of self-deception and it led to numerous publications.

== Psychotherapy career ==
Van Deurzen began her career in psychotherapy by doing voluntary work at the Psychiatric Hospital of Montpellier, Font D’Aurelle, in the children's and outpatient departments, between 1971 and 1973 together with her first husband, psychiatrist Jean Pierre Fabre. They moved to the psychiatric hospital of Saint Alban, in the Massif Central department of the Lozère where they lived and worked between 1973 and 1975 in this revolutionary hospital which originated institutional psychotherapy and which was made famous by the work of François Tosquelles and Frantz Fanon.

Van Deurzen had a full-time post as psychologist in the social therapy department and worked with groups, mostly with psychodrama and systems therapy, but also running the weekly large patient group in relation to the hospital newsletter Trait d’Union as well as directing a number of plays. From 1975 to 1977, the couple lived and worked in the Psychotherapeutic Centre La Candelie, in Agen, Lot et Garonne, where they were supervised by Lacanian analyst Dr. François Tosquelles. In 1977, they were invited to come work in London with Joseph H. Berke and Morton Schatzman and lived and worked in an Arbours Association therapeutic community as well as assisting at the Crisis Centre and being involved with the Philadelphia Association, with R. D. Laing and his colleagues.

During this period, Van Deurzen began teaching existential therapy in the Arbours training programme and started developing her own ideas. She also entered into a lifelong friendship with Hungarian psychiatrist Thomas Stephen Szasz. In 1978, van Deurzen and Fabre made a three months long work study trip to California where they spent time at the Esalen Institute, as guests of Richard Price, and received training in Gestalt therapy and body therapy. Van Deurzen met with Gregory Bateson at Esalen and Hubert Lederer Dreyfus at Berkeley University and together they met with John Weir Perry to speak about madness as well as having meetings with several members of the Palo Alto Mental Research Institute and visiting The Soteria model halfway house of Loren Richard Mosher in San Jose.

== Lecturing and academic career ==
From 1978 onwards van Deurzen has lectured on her method of existential therapy in many different contexts and countries. She came to formulate her own version of existential therapy, based in her lifelong objective of uniting philosophy and psychology. She taught for the Arbours Association, and South West London College from the seventies onwards and started teaching at Antioch University, London centre, from 1978. She created the first master's programme in existential psychotherapy with Antioch University in 1982 and was able to help the Antioch programmes to move to Regent's University London in 1985 and joined the Regent's faculty as Head of the Psychology department, when the program was incorporated into the college. She was made a professor in psychotherapy and counselling and appointed Dean of the School of Psychotherapy and Counselling at Regent's University, after co-founding this with the president of the then Regent's College, John Payne.

Van Deurzen left Regent's University in 1996, to found the New School for Psychotherapy and Counselling in London. This was initially based at the London centre of Schiller International University (SIU), where she was made an honorary professor. Van Deurzen and Tantam also co-founded the Centre for the Study of Conflict and Reconciliation at the University of Sheffield in 1999 when van Deurzen became an honorary lecturer, then a reader at the university. In 2005 she became an honorary professor and was involved in four large European funded research projects in psychotherapy with Digby Tantam and colleagues from around Europe, including Ireland, Poland, Austria, Romania, France, Portugal, Belgium, Italy and Czechia. Tantam and van Deurzen were both awarded visiting associate status by Darwin College, Cambridge University in 2007. The New School was moved to the old Decca Recording Studios on Belsize Road in 2010 as Tantam and van Deurzen re established their ownership of the company and in 2014 NSPC was settled in purpose built accommodation at Fortune Green in West Hampstead, London, which became the Existential Academy, from where the New School continues to operate.'

== Scholarly work and researches ==
Van Deurzen has published 20 academic books, 70 chapters and well over 100 papers in journals. She published her first chapter on existential therapy in 1984 in Windy Dryden's Handbook on individual psychotherapy. Her first book on her existential approach to psychotherapy and counselling was published in 1987 with Sage, has known several editions and continues to be a bestseller. The book led directly to her initiative in founding the Society for Existential Analysis (SEA) and its Journal of Existential Analysis.

=== Structural Existential Analysis and Early Work (1970s–1980s) ===
Emmy van Deurzen developed her foundational model of structural existential analysis in the 1970s while working in psychiatric hospitals in France. Drawing on the work of Ludwig Binswanger and her own clinical observations, she conceptualized a four-world model of human existence—physical (Umwelt), social (Mitwelt), personal (Eigenwelt), and spiritual (Überwelt). The originality of the model is further enhanced by its emphasis on the paradoxical nature of each dimension, showing the dialectical movement between polarities and inevitable tensions at each level. It became the basis of her method of Structural Existential Analysis.

=== Existential Counselling and Psychotherapy (1987–1990s) ===
Van Deurzen's first major book, Existential Counselling in Practice (1987), later republished in expanded editions, articulated her therapeutic approach in accessible language. She introduced the "emotional compass" to map emotions across the four existential dimensions, linking them to human values. In 1988, she co-founded the Society for Existential Analysis and in 1993 became a key figure in professional regulation as the first elected Chair of the UK Council for Psychotherapy (UKCP). 'she also represented psychotherapists in Europe at the European Commission and Council of Europe as external relations officer of the European Association for Psychotherapy (EAP).

=== Publications and Thought Leadership (1990s–2000s) ===
Her second major book, Everyday Mysteries (1996), offered a comprehensive synthesis of existential philosophy and therapy, presenting philosophical and clinical material in pragmatic terms. Her third major work, Paradox and Passion (1998), reflected on emotional tensions and personal experience, including her early struggles with suicidality. Throughout the 2000s, she published extensively, including the co-authored Dictionary of Existential Psychotherapy and Counselling (2005) and several edited volumes on existential perspectives in supervision, coaching, and relationships. With Martin Adams, she co-authored Skills in Existential Counselling & Psychotherapy (2011), a practical guide for clinicians.

=== Existential-Phenomenological Research and Structural Methodology (2010s–2020s) ===
Van Deurzen developed a research method rooted in existential therapy, integrating phenomenological, hermeneutic, heuristic, and narrative elements. Her Structural Existential Analysis (co-authored with Claire Arnold-Baker, 2022) formalized this approach, using five existential lenses—Space, Time, Purpose, Paradox, and Passion—and introduced the Existential Research Dialogue (ERD), a dialogical interview technique. She served as senior editor of The Wiley World Handbook of Existential Therapy (2019), the most comprehensive text in the field, bringing together leading figures like Irvin Yalom, Alfried Laengle, and Kirk Schneider.

In 2014, van Deurzen and her husband Digby Tantam created the Existential Academy, a community interest company, in West Hampstead, on Fortune Green Road, where they offer five masters programmes and two doctoral programmes in conjunction with Middlesex University, as well as a range of short courses. In 2023, van Deurzen and Digby Tantam semi-retired and though they continue to direct the New School, the Existential Academy and their associate private practice Dilemma Consultancy their colleagues Dr. Claire Arnold-Baker and Danny van Deurzen-Smith have taken over the daily management, as principal and deputy principal respectively. Over the years, van Deurzen has given over 300 keynote lectures and invited workshops around the world, on five continents.

=== Political Engagement and Activism ===
Following the 2016 Brexit referendum, van Deurzen became active in defending the rights of EU citizens in the UK. She founded the Voices for Europe initiative and served as Vice Chair of the New Europeans. She organized free counselling services for affected populations and gave public speeches, including at several major protests in Parliament Square. The Existential Academy also provided free emotional support services for Ukrainians who took refuge in the UK during the UK/Russian war and to all those affected by the war between Israel and Gaza.

=== Recent Works and Public Engagement ===
In Psychotherapy and the Quest for Happiness (2009), van Deurzen critiqued both psychopathology and naïve positivity, advocating for a nuanced existential perspective. Her more recent book Rising from Existential Crisis (2022) addressed the psychological effects of sociopolitical trauma and immigration. She also wrote and produced the documentary Bringing Wisdom to the World (2023), promoting the Existential Movement, which aims to infuse public discourse with philosophical and existential insight. In 2022, she signed with Penguin for Beginning to Live: The Art of Existential Freedom, a popularized account of her therapeutic wisdom.

=== Beginning to Live: The Art of Existential Freedom ===
In 2026, van Deurzen published Beginning to Live: The Art of Existential Freedom with Allen Lane and Penguin Press. Described as her 21st book and her first mainstream book for a general readership, it draws on more than five decades of her work in existential psychotherapy and philosophy. The book develops van Deurzen's four-dimensional framework of existence, comprising the physical world (Umwelt), the social world (Mitwelt), the personal world (Eigenwelt), and the ideal or spiritual world (Überwelt). It considers how tensions between these dimensions shape people's experiences and decisions. Drawing on the work of philosophers including Søren Kierkegaard, Friedrich Nietzsche, Jean-Paul Sartre, Simone de Beauvoir, and Hannah Arendt, van Deurzen examines the relationship between human freedom, responsibility, and the conditions in which choices are made. Van Deurzen argues that psychological distress can be understood in the context of the fundamental conditions of human existence and not only through the framework of psychiatric diagnosis. She examines how people respond to uncertainty, loss, and difficult life circumstances and discusses ways of approaching these experiences through existential reflection and personal choice. The book also addresses what van Deurzen describes as the tendency to pathologize ordinary forms of distress and emphasizes engagement with uncertainty and freedom as aspects of human life.

The book received reviews in The Guardian and the Times Literary Supplement. In The Guardian, Sophie McBain described the book as a profound examination of existential courage and its application to struggles and uncertainty. In the Times Literary Supplement, Anna Katharina Schaffner noted its rejection of simple solutions and described its use of case studies and existential approaches to questions concerning the fundamental conditions of human life.

== Personal life ==
Van Deurzen married Jean Pierre Fabre, a French psychiatrist, in 1972 and they remained together till 1978. They had no children. Van Deurzen married David Livingstone Smith, now an American philosopher and professor at New England University, in 1980, and they had two children, Benjamin Yuri Smith, in 1981 and Sasha Daniella Smith, in 1985. The couple remained together till 1996. Van Deurzen married Digby John Howard Tantam, a British professor of psychiatry and psychotherapy, in 1998, after they met through their work with the United Kingdom Council for Psychotherapy. Digby has two children by his previous wife, Robert Tantam, born 1978 and Grace Tantam, born in 1980.

== Honours ==
She received the American Psychological Association Distinguished Lifetime Achievement Award for contributions to Humanistic Psychology, as part of division 32’s heritage awards at the Washington annual APA congress in August 2026.

In 2024 van Deurzen was honoured with a lifelong honorary fellowship by the British Psychological Society for services to psychology and psychotherapy. Van Deurzen was elected an honorary member of the European Association for Psychotherapy in Vienna for having led the organization in creating the European Certificate for Psychotherapy. In 2021 she was made an honorary life member of the Federation for Existential Therapy in Europe. Van Deurzen was elected an advisor of the Rocky Mountain Humanistic counselling and Psychological Association in 2019. In 2017 she was made an honorary member to the Indian Society for Existential Psychotherapy.

In 2015, van Deurzen was made Honorary member of the Circulo de Estudios en Psicoterapia Existencial por una Co-existencia Apasionata, Mexico City. She was made an honorary member of the Latin American Association for Existential Therapy in Buenos Aires in 2013. She was nominated for a Lifetime Achievement Award by the BPS Division of Counselling Psychology in 2013 and in 2012 she was given a lifetime achievement award by the International Network of Meaning in Toronto, Canada. She was invited on to the editorial boards of many journals, including the Psychotherapy and Counselling Journal of Australia, the Humanistic Psychologist (APA) and the Existential Analysis Journal. Her other honors include:

- 2007–2008, Visiting Associate, Darwin College, Cambridge University
- 2006, Fellow, United Kingdom Council for Psychotherapy
- 2005, Honorary Fellow, Swedish Association for Existential Psychotherapy (SEPT)
- 2001, Fellow, British Association for Counselling and Psychotherapy (BACP)
- 1999, Fellow, British Psychological Society (BPS)
- 1999–2002, Official Delegate to the Council of Europe, for the European Association for Psychotherapy (EAP)
- 1998–1999, Chair of the British Psychological Society, Psychotherapy Section
- 1998, Honorary European Certificate for Psychotherapy
- 1997–1999, Chair of the Universities Psychotherapy Association (UPCA)
- 1995–2002, European Association for Psychotherapy (EAP) Ambassador

== Books ==
- Beginning to Live: The Art of Existential Freedom, (2026) London: Penguin Press.
- Structural Existential Analysis: an Existential-Phenomenological Method for Researching Life, (2025) with Claire Arnold-Baker, London: Routledge.
- Rising from Existential Crisis: Living Beyond Calamity, (2021) Monmouth: Monmouth: PCCS books.
- Wiley World Handbook for Existential Therapy, (2019) Co-edited with Craig, E., Schneider K. Längle, A., Tantam, D. and du Plock, S, London: Wiley
- Existential Therapy: Distinctive Features, London: Routledge. (2018) Co-authored with Claire Arnold-Baker, London: Routledge
- Skills in Existential Counselling and Psychotherapy, 2nd Edition (2016). Co-authored with Martin Adams, London: Sage.
- Paradox and Passion in Psychotherapy, Second Edition (2015). Chichester: Wiley
- Existential Perspectives on Relationship Therapy (2013). Edited with Susan Iacovou, London: Palgrave Macmillan.
- Existential Psychotherapy and Counselling in Practice, Third Edition (2012), London: Sage Publications
- Existential Perspectives on Coaching (2012). Co-edited with Monica Hanway, London: Palgrave, Macmillan
- Skills in Existential Counselling and Psychotherapy (2011). Co-authored with Martin Adams, London: Sage Publications
- Everyday Mysteries: A Handbook of Existential Psychotherapy, Second Edition (2010), London: Routledge
- Existential Perspectives on Supervision (2009). Co-edited with Sarah Young, London: Palgrave Macmillan
- Psychotherapy and the Quest for Happiness (2008), London: Sage Publications
- Dictionary of Existential Psychotherapy and Counselling (2005). With Raymond Kenward, London: Sage
- Existential Perspectives on Existential and Human Issues (2005). Edited with Claire Arnold-Baker, Basingstoke: Palgrave, Macmillan
- Existential Psychotherapy and Counselling in Practice, Second Edition (2002), London: Sage
- Paradox and Passion in Psychotherapy (1998), Chichester: Wiley
- Everyday Mysteries: Existential Dimensions of Psychotherapy (1997), London: Routledge
- Existential Counselling in Practice (1988), London: Sage
