= Anthony Ryle =

English medical doctor

Anthony Ryle (2 March 1927 – 29 September 2016), was an English medical doctor. He studied at Oxford and University College Hospital, qualified in medicine in 1949. He worked as a General Practitioner in North London, then directed the University of Sussex Health service, and later worked as a Consultant Psychotherapist in St. Thomas' Hospital, London, from 1983 to 1992. While in general practice he realised that a lot of his patients were presenting with psychological problems or distress, which he confirmed by epidemiological studies. He developed interest in psychotherapy and later developed a time limited therapy which can be offered in the National Health Service. This type of therapy is known as cognitive analytic therapy. In the 1960s he moved to Kingston, on the outskirts of Lewes, East Sussex with his wife and four children.

Ryle died aged 89 on 29 September 2016. Tony is survived by his second wife, Flora Natapoff, and two stepchildren, Sasha and Sam; by the four children, Martin, Cym, Conrad and Miriam, from his first marriage, to Rosemary (nee Langstaff), which ended in divorce; and by nine grandchildren and four great-grandchildren.

== Early life ==
Anthony Ryle was born in Brighton, the son of Professor John Alfred Ryle and Miriam (née Scully) Ryle. He was the nephew of Oxford University Professor of Philosophy Gilbert Ryle. He had several siblings, one brother being the Nobel prize-winning astrophysicist Martin Ryle, and another, John, was also a doctor. From Gresham’s school, Norfolk, he went to Oxford University and University College London, qualifying in medicine in 1949. He co-founded the innovative Caversham group practice in Kentish Town, north London, just after the inception of the NHS, which, as a lifelong socialist, he fervently supported. His political concerns and nonconformism contributed to a sense of social responsibility that still pervades the model and the CAT community.

When he was a teenager, he also had several encounters with the famous philosopher Ludwig Wittgenstein when the philosopher stayed in his father's house.

== Publications ==
=== Chapters ===
Critically engaging CBT: The view from CAT. Chapter 3 in Critically engaging CBT. Del Loewenthal and Richard House (eds.). McGraw-Hill: Open University Press (2010)

=== Books ===
- Ryle, A. (1990) Cognitive Analytic Therapy: Active Participation in Change. Chichester: John Wiley & Sons.
- (1995) Research relating to CAT. In Cognitive Analytic Therapy: Developments in Theory and Practice (ed. A. Ryle), pp. 174– 189. Chichester: John Wiley & Sons.
- (1997) Cognitive Analytic Therapy for Borderline Personality Disorder: The Model and the Method. Chichester: John Wiley & Sons.
- (2014) Diary from the Edge - 1940-1944: A Wartime Adolescence. London: The Hedge Press.

=== Articles ===
- (1991) "Object relations theory and activity theory: a proposed link by way of the procedural sequence model". British Journal of Medical Psychology, 64, 307– 316.
- (1992) "Critique of a Kleinian case presentation". British Journal of Medical Psychology, 65, 309 – 317.
- (1993) "Addiction to the death instinct? A critical review of Joseph’ s paper 'Addiction to near death' ". British Journal of Psychotherapy, 10, 88 – 92.
- (1994 a) "Projective identification: a particular form of reciprocal role procedure". British Journal of Medical Psychology, 67, 107 – 114.
- (1994 b) "Persuasion or education: the role of reformulation in CAT". International Journal of Short Term Psychotherapy, 9, 111 – 118.
- (1995) "Defensive organizations or collusive interpret-ations? A further critique of Kleinian theory and practice". British Journal of Psychotherapy, 12, 60 – 68.
- (1996) "Ogden’s autistic-contiguous position and the role of interpretation in analytic theory building". British Journal of Medical Psychology, 69, 129– 138.
- (1998) "Transferences and countertransferences: the cognitive analytic therapy perspective". British Journal of Psychotherapy, 14, 303 – 309.
