= Counselling in the United Kingdom =

In the United Kingdom, counselling is not under statutory regulation, and is overseen and supported by several organisations, none of which are officially recognised by the government.

== National regulation ==
In 2007 the Health Professions Council (HPC), which is independent of any professional body, released a white paper, Trust Assurance and Safety – The Regulation of Health Professionals in the 21st Century, which said that the Government intended to introduce statutory regulation for psychotherapists and counsellors.

The HPC set up a working group of stakeholders, known as a Professional Liaison Group, to consider and make recommendations to the HPC about how psychotherapists and counsellors might be regulated, in light of the statements made in the white paper. The HPC held a public consultation on the PLG recommendations, which ran for three months in 2009. Following the consultation, the PLG was reconvened and had its last meeting on 2 February 2011.

In February 2011, the Government published a command paper, Enabling Excellence, which set out the coalition government's policy on professional regulation. The paper outlined a system of what it called "assured voluntary registration" and said that in the future statutory regulation will only be considered where there is a "compelling case", and where "voluntary registers are not considered sufficient to manage this risk". Later that month, the HPC's Chief Executive Marc Seale wrote to Anne Milton MP, then Parliamentary Under-Secretary of State for Public Health, seeking clarification of the coalition government's policy on the statutory regulation of psychotherapists and counsellors.

At its meeting on 31 March 2011 the Council discussed the response received from Anne Milton MP. The letter said: "...it is not currently our intention to proceed with statutory regulation of psychotherapists and counsellors".

== Counselling organisations ==
The British Association For Counselling and Psychotherapy (BACP)

The largest UK counselling organisation is the British Association for Counselling and Psychotherapy (BACP). It grew from the Standing Conference for the Advancement of Counselling, a grouping of organisations inaugurated in 1970 at the instigation of the National Council for Voluntary Organisations. Membership was extended to include individuals when in 1977, with the aid of a grant from the Home Office Voluntary Service Unit, the British Association for Counselling (BAC) was founded. In 1978 the headquarters was moved from London to Rugby courtesy of the National Marriage Guidance Council which provided free accommodation to help the association establish itself.

During the 1980s, the BAC began the process of professionalising counselling in Britain, first introducing a code of practise for counsellors (1986), a member's register and a complaints panel for clients. (1987) Other counselling groups from the churches and from various counselling traditions affiliated with the organisation.

In September 2000, the Association recognised that it no longer represented just counselling, but also psychotherapy. It changed its name to the British Association for Counselling and Psychotherapy (BACP) and moved to new premises in Lutterworth. BACP is now the largest and broadest body within the sector with approximately 65,000 individual members. BACP participates in the development of counselling and psychotherapy at an international level.

The Survivors Trust

According to the introduction on their main website The Survivors Trust is a national umbrella agency for over 125 specialist voluntary sector agencies throughout the UK and Ireland providing a range of counselling, therapeutic and support services working with women, men and children who are victims/survivors of rape, sexual violence and sexual abuse. The organisation aims to offer a national collective voice to support and empower survivor groups, to educate and inform acknowledgment of and response to sexual abuse on a local and national level.

College of Sexual and Relationship Therapists (COSRT)

The College of Sexual and Relationship Therapists (COSRT) is a non-profit membership organisation that acts as the professional body for therapists specialising in sexual and relationship issues. Originally founded in 1978 as the British Association for Sexual and Relationship Therapy, it holds two Registers covering Psychosexual and Relationship Therapies. These are public records of specialist therapists who meet prescribed standards. The organisation sets professional standards for therapists, provides training programmes, and maintains ethical and professional conduct policies that all Members must adhere to.

The National Counselling Society

The National Counselling Society (NCS) is a not-for-profit membership organisation, founded by a group of counsellors, psychotherapists, psychologists and hypnotherapists in 1999. The aim of the NCS is to promote and support the practice of counselling, and does so by offering a range of services to members, including a comprehensive training programme. The NCS also benefits the patients of counsellors by ensuring that the counsellors in their organisation follow their stringent code of ethics; facing expulsion if they deviate or break any of their established codes of conduct and practice.

COSCA (Counselling & Psychotherapy in Scotland)

COSCA is a professional body for counselling and psychotherapy in Scotland, which seeks to advance all forms of counselling and psychotherapy and the use of counselling skills.

According to the organisations website, COSCA's aims are to increase accessibility to counselling and psychotherapy, develop ethically-based professional standards and quality assurance for counselling, psychotherapy and the use of counselling skills, increase access to training and information on counselling, psychotherapy and counselling skills, deliver a range of services that meet the needs of the counselling and psychotherapy field, provide opportunities for sharing knowledge, experience and resources for the advancement of counselling, psychotherapy and the use of counselling skills in Scotland.

The Counselling Society

The Counselling Society is one of a number of UK counselling professional organisations. According to the introduction on their website in 2007, the Counselling Society launched a campaign by contacting every UK MP, Peer and other national stakeholder via Blake's Parliamentary Yearbook. It proposed a criminal offence of “abuse by a healthcare professional” which would include counsellors as a matter of public safety. This would give courts powers to ban abusive counsellors from practising.

The Human Givens Institute

According to their main page, the Human Givens Institute (HGI) is a membership organisation and resource open to anyone wishing to support the new school of psychology known as the Human Givens approach.
