= Martin A. Conway =

British memory studies psychologist (1952–2022)

Martin Conway
- Born: Martin Anthony Conway; 18 August 1952; Darlington, England
- Died: 30 March 2022 (aged 69); Newcastle upon Tyne, England

Academic background
- Education: University College London; Open University
- Thesis: Content and organisational differences between autobiographical and semantic memories (1984)

Academic work
- Institutions: City, University of London
- Doctoral students: Aikaterini Fotopoulou

Martin Anthony Conway (Note: Spelling of his middle name in sources varies between Antony and Anthony.) (18 August 1952 – 30 March 2022) was a British psychologist focusing on the study of autobiographical memory, as well as the interactions between human memory and the law. He served as head of the psychology department, City, University of London before his death.

== Career ==
He worked for five years at the Medical Research Council Applied Psychology Unit (now the Cognition and Brain Sciences Unit) (1982-1988) He then took up lectureship posts at the University of Hertfordshire and the University of Lancaster before being appointed professor at the University of Bristol in 1993. After nine years at Bristol he moved to Durham University (2001-2006), then to the University of Leeds (2006-2012), and finally to City University, London from which he retired in 2021.

Conway spoke at Monash University Malaysia in 2016.

== Research ==
Conway is known for his pioneering research in the study of autobiographical memory, and has amassed over 14,000 citations as listed on Scopus. Two of his publications that have had the largest impact on the field are "Memory and the Self" (2005) and "The Construction of Autobiographical Memories in the Self-Memory System" (2005).

According to Chris Moulin, Daniel Schacter listed Conway's top scientific outputs as:

- "Ten Things the Law and Others Should Know about Human Memory" (2012),
- "A Cross-Cultural Investigation of Autobiographical Memory: On the Universality and Cultural Variation of the Reminiscence Bump" (2005),
- "On the Very Long-Term Retention of Knowledge Acquired Through Formal Education: Twelve Years of Cognitive Psychology" (1991),
- "Neurophysiological Correlates of Memory for Experienced and Imagined Events" (2003),
- "The Formation of Flashbulb Memories" (1994),
- Flashbulb Memories (1994 & 1995),
- "The Remembering–Imagining System" (2016),
- "The Structure of Autobiographical Memory" (multiple),
- "Organization in Autobiographical Memory" (1987, listed as 1993),
- "Memory and the Self" (2005), and
- "The Construction of Autobiographical Memories in the Self-Memory System" (2005).
