= Association for Cognitive Analytic Therapy =

The Association for Cognitive Analytic Therapy (ACAT) is the United Kingdom's professional association of Cognitive Analytic Therapy (CAT).

ACAT is an organisational member of UKCP providing accreditation and training to therapists
