= Tarzan Basaruddin =

Indonesian professor (born 1961)

Advisor to the Minister of Higher Education, Research, and Technology for Higher Education
- Incumbent
- Assumed office 4 February 2025
- Preceded by: office established

Director of the Executive Board of the National Accreditation Board for Higher Education
- In office 22 September 2016 – 29 November 2021
- Preceded by: office established
- Succeeded by: Ari Purbayanto

Dean of the Faculty of Computer Sciences of the University of Indonesia
- In office 11 October 2004 – 20 December 2013
- Preceded by: Toemin A. Masoem
- Succeeded by: Mirna Adriani

Personal details
- Born: October 25, 1961 (age 64) Kaur, Bengkulu, Indonesia
- Spouse: Evi Syaiful
- Children: 3

Tarzan "Chan" Basaruddin (born 25 November 1961) is an Indonesian higher education quality and management official and professor of computer science at the University of Indonesia (UI). He is currently serving advisor (expert staff) to the Minister of Higher Education, Research, and Technology for higher education affairs. Prior to his appointment in the ministry, Basaruddin was the dean of the UI's faculty of computer sciences and the director of the executive board of the National Accreditation Board for Higher Education. He specializes in numerical computation and high-performance computing.

== Early life and education ==
Tarzan Basaruddin was born on 25 November 1961 in Kaur, Bengkulu, as the sixth of nine children of Badaruddin and Sumratul Aini, who both worked as farmers. He completed his elementary education at an Islamic elementary school in his birthplace before attending the Religious Teacher Education (PGA) school in Manna, South Bengkulu. While in the third grade of PGA, he took the junior high school examination. After obtaining his junior high diploma, he continued his studies at SMAN 1 Manna. Subsequently, he pursued higher education at Gadjah Mada University, majoring in Mathematics, where he earned his bachelor's degree with cum laude honors at the end of 1984, completing his undergraduate studies in four and a half years with a GPA of 3.70, becoming the best graduate of his cohort.

== Career ==
Basaruddin's professional career began in early 1985 on the staff at the Center for Computer Science at the University of Indonesia. He then continued his studies in computing at the University of Manchester in 1986, earning his master of science degree in 1988 and his Ph.D. in 1990. Upon the establishment of the Faculty of Computer Science at the University of Indonesia in 1993, he was appointed as deputy dean for academic affairs from 1994 to 2000. From 2000 to 2003, he served as deputy dean for student affairs. During his tenure, he proposed to merge student activities with academic affairs. The concept was approved by the UI leadership and the two position was combined in 2002. From 2002 to 2005, he was the secretary of the council of higher education in the Directorate General of Higher Education, after previously working as a reviewer for the council since 1996.

On 11 October 2004, Basaruddin was installed as the faculty dean after passing an assessment by UI's board of trustees. He was re-selected for a second term and served until 20 December 2013. In August 2012, Basaruddin and other UI deans filed a letter of complaint to education Minister Mohammad Nuh, explaining their motion of no confidence against UI rector Gumilar Rusliwa Somantri for dismissing seven deans in the university. Gumilar's decision was reversed following a meeting between the university's board of trustees and the minister of education in August that year. During his tenure, Basaruddin unsuccessfully ran for rector of UI in 2012 and 2014.

Basaruddin continued his involvement in academic administration and became an expert consultant for higher education development in Sri Lanka, Jordan, and Mongolia. On 22 September 2016, Basaruddin was installed as director of the executive board of the National Accreditation Board for Higher Education (BAN-PT). During his tenure, Basaruddin updated its accreditation assessment to be more specific and simplified, splitting evaluations into institutional assessment and major-specific assessment, with the latter being handled by independent accreditation bodies. In 2019, he received an honorary doctorate in management science from the Universiti Sains Malaysia for his contributions to higher education quality and management. On 4 February 2025, Tarzan was appointed as advisor (expert staff) for higher education affairs to the Minister of Higher Education, Science, and Technology.

== Personal life ==
Basaruddin is married to Evi Syaiful, also a native of Kaur, and they have three children. Their first child was born in England around 1993 while he was pursuing his doctoral studies.
