= British Psychoanalytic Council =

Organisation in Britain

- Predecessor: British Confederation of Psychotherapists
- Formation: 1992
- Location: Islington, London
- Leader: Lee Smith
- Website: https://www.bpc.org.uk

The British Psychoanalytic Council (BPC) is a UK-wide umbrella association of training institutions and professional bodies providing psychotherapy services to the public, mainly in the private sector. As implied in the title their therapeutic approaches are guided by analytical psychology and the psychoanalytic schools of psychology and treatment. It is a registered charity (number: 1185487).

== History ==
The formation of the BPC dates back to 8 March 1992, when it broke away from the United Kingdom Standing Conference for Psychotherapy, currently the UKCP, as the then British Confederation of Psychotherapists with its firm allegiance to a psychoanalytically oriented understanding of the mind and of human behaviour. At that stage it represented up to one thousand clinical practitioners, members of organisations working independently or employed in NHS mental health services, in Child Guidance clinics, or special schools. Since then, the member organisations of the BPC have expanded to comprise some 2,000 registered clinicians.

== Services ==
The BPC accredits the trainings of its member institutions, ensuring that they meet published training standards. Some of these are also member organisations of the International Association for Analytical Psychology or the International Psychoanalytical Association, over which BPC has no authority.

=== Annual Register ===
Promoting professional standards and acting as a voluntary regulator of the profession is a main task of the BPC. It administers the assessments and audits of individual practitioners who seek to achieve registrant status of the BPC which enables their names to go onto the BPC register.

It publishes and maintains an annual register of clinical practitioners who meet its continuing professional and fitness-to-practise standards. Their specialisms, modalities and languages are also listed. The practitioners include child psychoanalysts, couple therapists, Jungian analysts, psychoanalysts and some group analysts.

=== Practice requirements ===
BPC registration is governed by the following fitness to practise requirements:

- The practitioner must be a member of good standing of a BPC member professional institution
- Must subscribe to and be governed by the BPC's published Code of Ethics
- Be regulated by the BPC's Complaints Procedure
- Must undergo a sustained annual programme of continuing professional development (CPD), monitored and approved by the BPC, with regular consultation on their clinical work, fitness to practice, professional indemnity insurance, attending clinic-related lectures and courses and a broad range of professional activity, including research, teaching and writing.

=== Conferences and events ===
As part of its services to member organisations, BPC has an on-going programme of topical conferences. It publishes an online newsletter and a printed quarterly, New Associations with articles, despatched to registrants. It conducts occasional membership surveys on attitudes to a range of social matters.

== Safeguarding the public ==
The individual organisations which train psychotherapists have always been self-regulating. Over the last twenty years, however, there has been an increase in the number of institutions and range of psychotherapies on offer to the public. The British Psychoanalytic Council is one of a number of bodies which exist to protect the interests of the public by promoting standards in the selection, training, professional association and ethical conduct of psychotherapists. It is the principal body for regulating psychoanalytic psychotherapy in the UK.

The BPC, together with each of its member institutions, aims to protect the public by setting out the appropriate standards of professional conduct through a Code of Ethics, which describes the responsibilities of psychoanalytic psychotherapists. There are also comprehensive complaints and disciplinary procedures, which include the sanction of striking a practitioner off both from their parent organisation's membership list as well as from the BPC Register. The detailed fitness to practise policies are all published on its website or are available from the BPC office.

During October 2024 the British press signalled that self-regulation of therapists was not working according to investigations. They showed that some therapists and counsellors, including at least one GP, were able to set up in practice after having been struck off for misconduct by their member organisations, such as the BACP and UKCP. Misconduct was reported to include drug and sexual abuse. The majority of perpetrators were male practitioners exploiting female clients. In some cases, perpetrators had changed their names and joined other organisations where checks were inadequate, and continued to practice. Campaigners and MPs have called for stronger measures to protect the public. An undated and unsigned response by the BPC was released online to the investigative journalist, Patrick Strudwick, in the matter of the inadequate regulation of psychotherapists. Andrew Samuels, a long time psychotherapist and academic believes statutory regulation will neither help the public nor the profession in the current situation.

=== List of BPC Member Institutions ===
- Anna Freud Centre
- Association for Psychoanalytic Psychotherapy in the Public Sector
- Association for Psychodynamic Practice and Counselling in Organisational Settings
- Association of Jungian Analysts
- Birkbeck Counselling Association
- British Psychoanalytic Association
- British Psychoanalytical Society
- British Psychotherapy Foundation
- Enfield Counselling Service
- Forensic Psychotherapy Society
- Foundation for Psychotherapy and Counselling
- Gloucestershire Counselling Service
- Manor House Centre for Psychotherapy and Counselling
- North of England Association of Psychoanalytic Psychotherapists
- Northern Ireland Association for the Study of Psychoanalysis
- Scottish Association of Psychoanalytical Psychotherapists and Human Development Scotland
- Severnside Institute for Psychotherapy
- Society of Analytical Psychology
- Tavistock Relationships
- Tavistock and Portman NHS Foundation Trust
- Wessex Counselling
- West Midlands Institute of Psychotherapy

== See also ==
- British Association for Counselling and Psychotherapy
- Mental health in the United Kingdom
- Professional Standards Authority for Health and Social Care
- United Kingdom Council for Psychotherapy
