= Aikaterini Fotopoulou =

Greek psychologist and academic

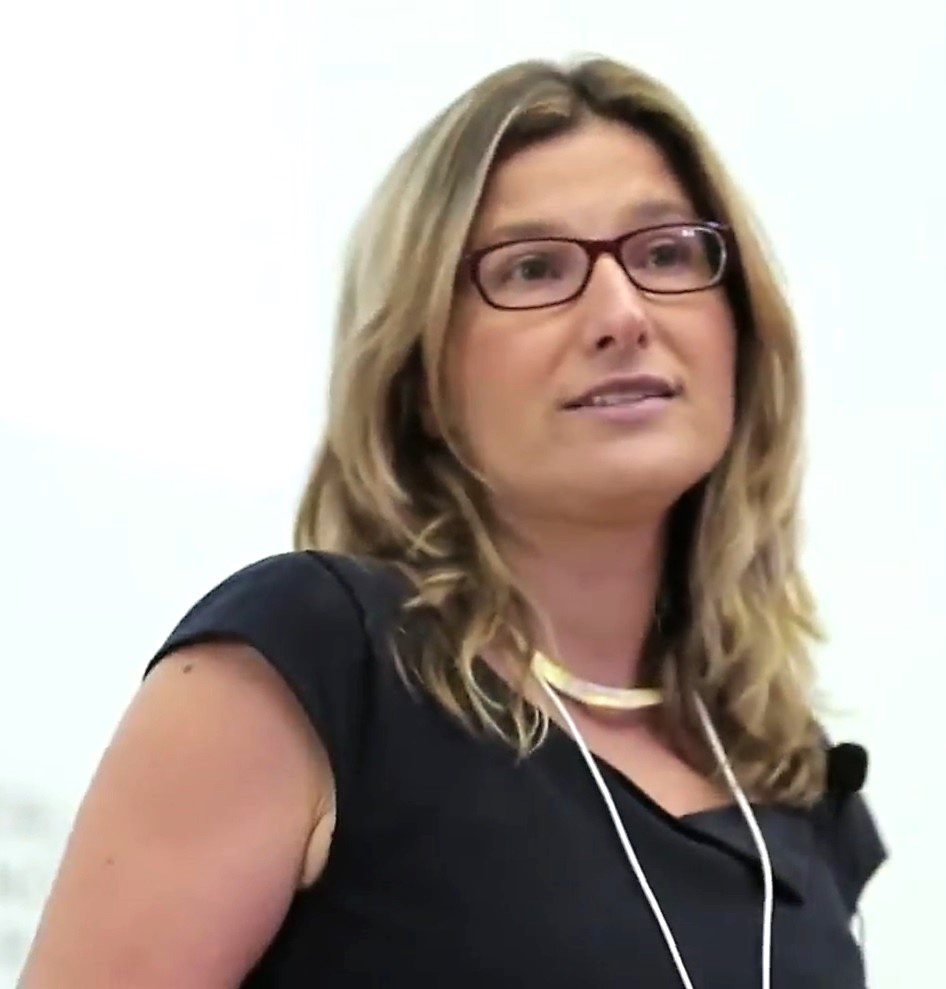
- Fotopoulou at the World Economic Forum in 2016
- Education: Durham University; University College London; University of Athens
- Scientific career
- Workplaces: University College London
- Thesis: Confabulation: Constructing motivated memories (2005)
- Doctoral advisor: Martin A. Conway

Aikaterini Fotopoulou, also known as Katerina Fotopoulou, is a Greek psychologist and cognitive neuroscientist. She is Professor of Psychodynamic Neuroscience in the Research Department of Clinical, Educational and Health Psychology at University College London.

She is a Fellow of the Association for Psychological Science, past co-chair of its International Convention, and a past President of the Psychology Section of the British Science Association.

== Early life and education ==
Fotopoulou was born in Greece. As a child she wanted to become a journalist. She studied psychology at Panteio University of Social and Political Sciences in Athens. She subsequently earned Master's degrees in cognitive neuropsychology and theoretical psychoanalysis at University College London. Her doctoral research, where she focused on neurological confabulation, was completed at Durham University in 2005.

== Research and career ==
Fotopoulou's research revolves around the interaction between mental and somatic health. Her work examines how individuals’ perceptions of self—whether related to bodily awareness or autobiographical memory—are affected by neurological conditions such as stroke and dementia, as well as psychiatric disorders including eating disorders, somatic symptom disorders, and functional neurological conditions.

Fotopoulou has also conducted research on social affective regulation, or the ways in which individuals support one another’s emotional states. She has investigated neural responses to pain when family and friends are present. In related work, she has studied the use of affective touch in mitigating experiences of social exclusion, identifying an association between gentle tactile contact and social bonding. These findings suggested the existence of a physiological system linking the skin with neural processes involved in social affiliation.

Fotopoulou is also the founder and current Director of the Centre of Equality Research in Brain Sciences (the ERB Centre), which was the first research body of this kind.

== Awards and honours ==
- 2006 Clifford Yorke Prize
- 2010 Hellenic Medical Society of the UK Papanikolaou Prize
- 2011 British Neuropsychological Society Elizabeth Warrington Prize
- 2013 European Research Council Starting Investigator Grant (The Bodily Self)
- 2014 World Economic Forum Distinguished Young Scientist Award
- 2015 UCL Queen Square Institute of Neurology Dr Tony Pullen Lecturer of the Year Award
- 2018 European Research Council Consolidator Grant

== Selected publications ==
- Manos Tsakiris; Carpenter, Lewis; Dafydd James; Aikaterini Fotopoulou (2009). "Hands only illusion: multisensory integration elicits sense of ownership for body parts but not for non-corporeal objects". Experimental Brain Research. 204 (3): 343–352. doi:10.1007/s00221-009-2039-3. PMID 19820918. Wikidata Q48436600.
- Krahe, Charlotte; Anne Springer; Weinman, John; Aikaterini Fotopoulou (2013). "The social modulation of pain: others as predictive signals of salience - a systematic review". Frontiers in Human Neuroscience. 7: 386. doi:10.3389/fnhum.2013.00386. PMC 3719078. PMID 23888136. Wikidata Q37034560.
- Jean Decety; Aikaterini Fotopoulou (2014). "Why empathy has a beneficial impact on others in medicine: unifying theories". Frontiers in Behavioral Neuroscience. 8: 457. doi:10.3389/fnbeh.2014.00457. PMC 4294163. PMID 25642175. Wikidata Q34954624.
- Fotopoulou, Aikaterini; Pfaff, Donald; Conway, Martin A. (2012). From the couch to the lab : trends in psychodynamic neuroscience. Oxford: Oxford University Press. ISBN 978-0-19-960052-6. OCLC 762988782.
