= Digby Tantam =

British psychiatrist

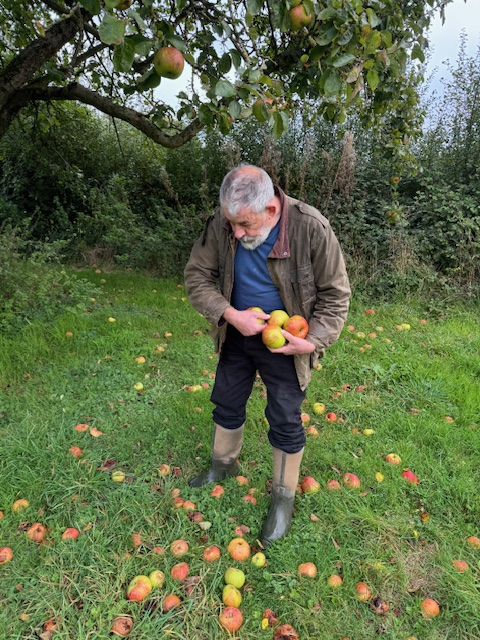
- Citizenship: British
- Education: Christ Church, Oxford; Harvard University; University of London
- Known for: formulating the concept of the interbrain
- Awards: Fellow of the Royal College of Psychiatrists,
- Scientific career
- Fields: Psychotherapy Psychology
- Institutions: University of Sheffield; Middlesex University; University of Warwick

Digby Tantam is a British psychiatrist, psychotherapist, psychologist, and author, known for his contributions to psychotherapy, autism research, and mental health policy. He is currently Emeritus Professor of Psychiatry at the University of Sheffield and visiting professor at Middlesex University. He is also known for formulating the concept of the interbrain, which describes a subliminal neurological connection enabling humans to understand others' emotions, intentions, and attention without explicit communication.

== Education ==
Tantam was educated at Christ Church, Oxford, where he received a BA in Animal Physiology in 1969, followed by an MA and BM, BCh in 1972. He trained as a psychiatrist in London and the United States, earning a Master of Public Health in Behavioral Sciences from Harvard University in 1977. In 1986, he completed a PhD at the University of London for a study focused on adult autism and eccentricity. His academic journey also includes studies at Yale, Stanford, Makerere University, and the Open University, where he earned a BA in Mathematics and Philosophy in 1984.

== Career ==
In clinical psychiatry, Tantam has served in numerous senior roles in both the UK and abroad. He was Senior Lecturer at the University of Manchester and Professor of Psychotherapy at the University of Warwick, where he also served as Consultant Psychiatrist. He spent several decades in the NHS as a psychotherapist and autism specialist, establishing in 1980 one of the first dedicated assessment services in the world for adults with autism spectrum conditions.

He was Chair of the United Kingdom Council for Psychotherapy and founding Chair of the Universities Psychotherapy and Counselling Service. He co-chaired the European Training Standards Committee of the European Association of Psychotherapy and served as the first Treasurer of the Federation of Existential Therapists in Europe. He is currently Treasurer of the Existential Movement and continues to be active in advancing standards in psychotherapy training and practice across Europe.

He has been providing a clinical service for people with autistic spectrum disorders since 1980, when he was awarded a training fellowship from the Medical Research Council (United Kingdom) to study Asperger syndrome. He created the Sheffield Asperger Assessment Service in 1995 when he moved to Sheffield from the University of Warwick, where he had been appointed to the first chair in psychotherapy in the UK.

Tantam was an Honorary Senior Visiting Research Fellow at the University of Cambridge.

He is a Fellow of the Royal College of Psychiatrists, a Chartered Psychologist, and has received fellowships from the Higher Education Academy, the British Association of Counselling and Psychotherapy, and the United Kingdom Council for Psychotherapy, among others. Over his career, he has been the recipient of several prestigious honors including the Gaskell Gold Medal and Prize from the Royal College of Psychiatrists, the University of Sheffield Senate Teaching Award, and lifetime honorary memberships from professional psychotherapy associations.

Tantam is an honorary life member of the Universities Psychotherapy and Counselling Association, treasurer of the Existential Movement, chair of the Society of Psychotherapy, former registrar of the European Association of Psychotherapy, and former chair of the United Kingdom Council for Psychotherapy.

== Research ==
Tantam’s research focused on the understanding of autism spectrum disorders (ASD) across the lifespan, integrating clinical insight with theoretical and neuroscientific frameworks. His 2012 book, Autism Spectrum Disorders Through the Life Span, offers an overview of the condition, drawing on his clinical experience and scholarship.

Tantam’s theoretical contributions extend to the study of non-verbal communication and affective neuroscience. His 2014 book, The Interbrain, explores the idea that humans are connected by a background neurological process that allows for emotional resonance and interpersonal intuition. According to Tantam, the interbrain may function through subliminal micro-signals, including visual cues and olfactory signals, which the brain processes outside of conscious awareness. He has argued that disruptions in this system help explain the communicative and relational challenges faced by neurodivergent individuals.

Tantam emphasizes the heterogeneity and developmental variability of ASD symptoms, highlighting how manifestations of the disorder evolve and interact with age. His analysis distinguishes the nuanced clinical presentations of Kanner syndrome, Asperger’s syndrome, and atypical Asperger’s syndrome across infancy, childhood, and adolescence.

Throughout his career, Tantam has combined empirical investigation with clinical practice, publishing nearly 200 articles and books.

== Personal life ==
Tantam is married to Emmy van Deurzen, a philosopher and psychotherapist. Tantam has two children, Robert and Grace, and two stepchildren, Ben and Danny.

== Selected bibliography ==
=== Journals ===
- Tantam, D.; Burns, B. J. (1979). "An international comparison of two systems of community mental health care". Psychological Medicine. 9 (3): 541–550. doi:10.1017/s0033291700032104. ISSN 0033-2917. PMID 482477.
- Tantam, Digby (1979). "Primary Mental Health Care in the United Kingdom". International Journal of Mental Health. 8 (2): 108–129. doi:10.1080/00207411.1979.11448836. ISSN 0020-7411. JSTOR 41344183.
- Tantam, D.; Kalucy, R.; Brown, D. G. (1982). "Sleep, scratching and dreams in eczema. A new approach to alexithymia". Psychotherapy and Psychosomatics. 37 (1): 26–35. doi:10.1159/000287552. ISSN 0033-3190. PMID 7111618.
- Bleuler, Manfred; Ciompi, Luc; Crow, T. J.; Abrahamson, David; Tantam, D. (1983). "Schizophrenic Deterioration". British Journal of Psychiatry. 143 (1): 77–84. doi:10.1192/S0007125000116575. ISSN 0007-1250. PMID 6882996.
- Balfe, Myles; Tantam, Digby (12 November 2010). "A descriptive social and health profile of a community sample of adults and adolescents with Asperger syndrome". BMC Research Notes. 3 (1): 300. doi:10.1186/1756-0500-3-300. ISSN 1756-0500. PMC 2992545. PMID 21070680.
- Balfe, M.; Tantam, D.; Campbell, M. (2011). "Possible Evidence for a Fall in the Prevalence of High-Functioning Pervasive Developmental Disorder with Age?". Autism Research and Treatment. 2011: 1–8. doi:10.1155/2011/325495. ISSN 2090-1925. PMC 3420578. PMID 22937245.
- Brugha, T. S.; McManus, S.; Smith, J.; Scott, F. J.; Meltzer, H.; Purdon, S.; Berney, T.; Tantam, D.; Robinson, J.; Radley, J.; Bankart, J. (29 July 2011). "Validating two survey methods for identifying cases of autism spectrum disorder among adults in the community". Psychological Medicine. 42 (3): 647–656. doi:10.1017/s0033291711001292. ISSN 0033-2917. PMID 21798110.
- Blackmore, Chris; Tantam, Digby; Parry, Glenys; Chambers, Eleni (24 February 2012). "Report on a Systematic Review of the Efficacy and Clinical Effectiveness of Group Analysis and Analytic/Dynamic Group Psychotherapy". Group Analysis. 45 (1): 46–69. doi:10.1177/0533316411424356. ISSN 0533-3164.
- Tantam, Digby (22 January 2014). "Adults with ASD". Current Developmental Disorders Reports. 1 (1): 1–7. doi:10.1007/s40474-013-0005-z. ISSN 2196-2987.
- van Deurzen, Emmy; Tantam, Digby (2016), "Creating the World Congress for Existential Therapy", Clarifying and Furthering Existential Psychotherapy, Cham: Springer International Publishing, pp. 145–156, doi:10.1007/978-3-319-31086-2_11, ISBN 978-3-319-31085-5
- Tantam, Digby (1995), "Why assess?", The Art and Science of Assessment in Psychotherapy, Abingdon, UK: Taylor & Francis, pp. 8–26, doi:10.4324/9780203359914_chapter_1, ISBN 978-0-203-37667-6

=== Books ===
- Goldberg, D.P. & Tantam, D. (eds.) (1990) The Public Health Impact of Mental Disorder, Hogrefe and Huber, Bern, 238pp
- Greenberg, M., Shergill, S., Szmukler, G., Tantam, D. (2002) Narratives in Psychiatry, Jessica Kingsley
- Greenberg, M., Szmukler, G & Tantam, D. (1986) Making Sense of Psychiatric Cases, Oxford: Oxford University Press
- Strang, J., Donmall, M., Webster, A., Abbey, J., Tantam, D. (1991) A Bridge Not Far Enough: Community Drug Teams and Doctors in the North Western Region, ISDD Research Monograph 3. London: Institute for the Study of Drug Dependence
- Tantam, D. (1988, 1991, 2000) A Mind of One's Own; National Autistic Society: London, 35pp, 1988. Polish translation 1996 in Autistic Child 4, 1, 4-19 and 4,2, 4-13, Japanese translation, Arabic translation 2005
- Tantam, D. and Birchwood, M. (eds. 1994) College Seminars in Psychology and Social Sciences, London: Gaskell Press
- Tantam, D., Duncan, A. and Appleby, L. (eds. 1996) Psychiatry for the Developing World, Gaskell Press
- Tantam, D. (ed. 1998) Clinical Topics in Psychotherapy, Gaskell Press
- Tantam, D. (2002) Psychotherapy and Counselling in Practice, Cambridge University Press
- Tantam, D. (2012) Autism Spectrum Disorders Through the Life Span, Jessica Kingsley Publishers 550pp
- Tantam, D. (2014) Emotional Well-being and Mental Health: A Guide for Counsellors & Psychotherapists, SAGE Publications Ltd
- Tantam, Digby (2018). The interbrain: embodied connections versus common knowledge. London: Jessica Kingsley publishers. ISBN 978-1-84905-476-8.
- Deurzen, Emmy; Craig, Erik; Längle, Alfried; Schneider, Kirk J.; Tantam, Digby; Plock, Simon, eds. (28 May 2019). The Wiley World Handbook of Existential Therapy (1 ed.). Wiley. doi:10.1002/9781119167198. ISBN 978-1-119-16715-0.
- Tantam, Digby (18 July 2024). Challenging Psychiatry's Reliance on the Disease Model. London: Routledge. doi:10.4324/9781032709444. ISBN 978-1-032-70944-4.
