= United Kingdom Council for Psychotherapy =

Psychotherapy association

- Abbreviation: UKCP
- Formation: 1993
- Type: Professional body
- Headquarters: America Square, London, EC3; United Kingdom
- Key people: Jon Levett (CEO)
- Website: www.psychotherapy.org.uk

The United Kingdom Council for Psychotherapy (UKCP) is a professional association of psychotherapy organisations and practitioners in the United Kingdom.

== History ==
The UKCP exists to "promote and maintain the profession of psychotherapy and the highest standards in the practice of psychotherapy throughout the United Kingdom, for the benefit of the public." Only psychotherapists or psycho-therapeutic counselors who meet UKCP's training requirements and abide by its ethical guidelines are included in its online "Register of Psychotherapists".

The UKCP was initially founded in the 1980s as the United Kingdom Standing Conference for Psychotherapy following the Foster Report (1971) and the Sieghart Report (1978), which recommended regulation of the psychotherapy field. It was formally inaugurated as a council in 1993.

UKCP also represents the United Kingdom in the European Association for Psychotherapy (EAP) – a Vienna-based umbrella organisation which sets standards for equivalence of training and practice throughout Europe.

== Chair ==
UKCP elects its chair among its members.

Term of office	Office holder
2024–present	Pippa Donovan (interim chair)
2023–2024	Christian Buckland
2022–2023	Jo Lucas (acting chair)
2022–2022	Syed Azmatullah
2016–2022	Martin Pollecoff
2012–2016	Janet Weisz
2009–2012	Andrew Samuels
2007–2009	James Gray Antrican
2005–2007	Lisa Wake (now de Rijk)
2002–2004	James Pollard
2001–2002	Alan Thomson
1998–2001	Ann Casement
1995–1998	Digby Tantam
1993–1995	Emmy van Deurzen
1989–1993	Michael R. Pokorny (Chair of the UK Standing Conference for Psychotherapy)

== Controversy ==
In October 2024 reports in the UK press alleged that self-regulation of therapists was ineffective. There were references to practitioners, including a GP, who were still able to set up in practice after having been struck off for misconduct by their member organisations, such as the BACP and UKCP. Misconduct was reported to include drug and sexual abuse. Campaigners and MPs have called for stronger measures to protect the public. However Professor Andrew Samuels, a long time psychotherapist and academic put forward the case that statutory regulation would not help the public nor the profession in the current ferment over abusive practitioners.

=== Transgender youth ===
In November 2023, the UK Council for Psychotherapy published a statement on gender critical views that "Psychotherapists and psychotherapeutic counsellors who hold such views are likely to believe that the clinically most appropriate approach to working therapeutically with individuals who present with gender dysphoria, particularly children and young people, is exploratory therapy, rather than medicalised interventions such as puberty blockers, cross-sex hormones or reassignment surgery." In April 2024 the UK Council for Psychotherapy withdrew from the Memorandum and membership of the Coalition against Conversion Therapy on the grounds of not wanting to oppose exploratory therapy for trans young people. The UKCP argued that the ban could ban "exploratory therapy" of why children want to change gender and the chairman of the UKCP told the Telegraph that "The current MoU makes no distinction between adults and children, which we believe is not in the best interest of children and could compromise their wellbeing."

Dr. Moon, head of the MoU, stated "It is with great regret that any organisation would want to leave the MOUv2 whose aim is to bring an end to conversion therapy" and "The MOU does not ask therapists to practise any model of therapy, all therapy models are exploratory to some degree". Directors of other signatory organisations also criticised the decision. A group called UKCP members Therapists Against Conversion Therapy and Transphobia (TACTT) published an open letter criticising the organisation and started a petition calling for the board's removal in response, which gained 1,500 signatures, more than 10% of the UKCP's membership. The board was retained as only 20% of voters called for their removal.

Despite the withdrawal, UKCP still states that it is against "all forms of conversion therapy" and encourages filings of complaints if any conversion therapy is practiced by UKCP members.

== See also ==
- British Association for Counselling and Psychotherapy
- British Psychoanalytic Council
- Association for Cognitive Analytic Therapy

General:

- Mental health in the United Kingdom
