= European Association for Psychotherapy =

European psychotherapy umbrella organization

The European Association for Psychotherapy (EAP) is a Vienna-based umbrella organisation for some 430 European psychotherapist organizations (including 33 national associations, 18 European associations and 80 EAP accredited training institutes) from 43 countries with a membership of more than 120,000 psychotherapists. Individual members may also join the organisation directly rather than through one of its member organisations.

EAP psychotherapy definition (March 2026)

« Psychotherapy is a distinct, scientifically grounded profession and clinical practice within the mental health field, dedicated to the alleviation of emotional-psychological, psychosomatic, relational, and behavioural distress, including difficulties that are persistent or developmentally rooted. It constitutes a dynamic, holistic, relational, and process-oriented form of treatment, grounded in a therapeutic alliance and guided by the individual's goals, values, and social context. Psychotherapy aims not only to reduce distress, but also to strengthen psychological resources, support personality functioning, and enhance long-term quality of life. Encompassing psychodynamic, humanistic, systemic, cognitive-behavioural, and integrative orientations, psychotherapy is characterised by its depth, breadth, and clinical responsibility in addressing complex and enduring difficulties. As a professional identity and practice, it is carried out by specifically trained psychotherapists whose competence is formed through specialised education, supervised clinical experience, and sustained self-reflective practice and ethical responsibility. »

The EAP has sponsored much of the European effort from the mid-1990s toward the professionalisation of psychotherapy and the formation of pan-European training standards, ethics and guidelines. Currently, it has representatives from 41 different countries and 30 different 'modalities' of psychotherapy.

In 2014, the European Skills, Competences, Qualifications and Occupations (ESCO) accepted that a psychotherapist (currently listed as a sub-sub-set of 'psychologist') is different from a psychologist.

A submission to the European Commission to establish the Common Training Framework for the Profession of 'Psychotherapist' was initiated in 2021.

The current President of EAP is Irena Bezić (Croatia); the general secretary of the EAP is Tom Warnecke (UK)

The association is based on the Strasbourg Declaration on Psychotherapy of 1990 whereby the EAP promotes the need for high standards of training on a scientific basis, and fights for free and independent exercise of psychotherapy in Europe. Important activities include:

- Creating a collaborative democratic forum for all European national and method-based professional associations in psychotherapy.
- Establishing pan-European professional post-graduate training standards (the 'ECP Standard') consisting of a minimum of 2,400 hours, over a minimum of four years, of specialist training, with a significant component of supervised practice. The ECP Standard has since been brought into alignment with the EQF, the 'European Qualifications Framework' (ISO/IEC 17024; 2012), also known as the 'Europass' and active in more than 30 countries. The ECP Standard matches EQF Level 7 and is implemented by all EAP accredited psychotherapy organisations throughout Europe.
- Awarding the European Certificate of Psychotherapy (ECP): The aim of the European Certificate of Psychotherapy is to implement a comparable standard of training and mutual recognition of training across Europe. EAP has awarded about 10.000 ECPs since 1997.
- Building the Register for ECP Psychotherapists: creating a searchable database of the availability of over 6,000 psychotherapists in Europe.
- Promoting EAP Ethical Guidelines: The EAP has developed generic ethical guidelines for psychotherapy to protect patients across Europe, applicable to all EAP affiliated psychotherapy organisations. EAP also created additional guidances or statements for specific contexts.
- EAP is also a founding member of the World Council for Psychotherapy (WCP).

== Publication ==
Publication of the International Journal of Psychotherapy ISSN 1356-9082, a professional journal with 3 issues per annum.
