= British Association for Counselling and Psychotherapy =

- Abbreviation: BACP
- Founded: 1977
- Type: Professional Body, Charity
- Registered office: 15 St John's Business Park, Lutterworth, Leicestershire, LE17 4HB
- Membership: 75,000 (approx.)
- CEO: Phil James
- Website: https://www.bacp.co.uk

The British Association for Counselling and Psychotherapy (BACP) is a professional body for counsellors and psychotherapists practising in the United Kingdom.

== History ==
Originally founded in 1977 as the British Association for Counselling, aided by a grant from the Home Office Voluntary Service Unit, it had emerged from the Standing Conference for the Advancement of Counselling. This body was inaugurated in 1970 at the instigation of the National Council for Voluntary Organisations. It was co-founded by the humanist activist Harold Blackham, and drew on detailed work Blackham had done for a non-religious counselling service for the British Humanist Association, which he led at the time. The organisation's Chair was Nicholas Tyndall, Chief Officer at the National Marriage Guidance Council (which later become Relate).

In 1978, the headquarters were relocated from London to Rugby courtesy of the National Marriage Guidance Council which provided free accommodation to help the association establish itself. The Association is now located in Lutterworth.

In September 2000, the Association recognised that it no longer represented only those involved in counselling, but also psychotherapy, and changed its name to the British Association for Counselling and Psychotherapy.

In September 2017, the branding was refreshed introducing a new logo, colour scheme, typeface and the slogan "counselling changes lives", based on a belief in the impact and benefits of the profession. This was Highly Commended in the 2018 memcom membership excellence awards stating that it "found success over various mediums" and "had a clear rationale for the brand relaunch and a strong proposition that counselling changes lives".

In November 2019, the membership was reported to have surpassed 50,000, prompting the Association to share celebratory and rewarding comments from its members as a way to mark the achievement. Individual members pay £178 per year for membership.

In October 2024, investigations led by the i newspaper showed that regulation of counsellors and psychotherapists was inadequate and exposed vulnerable members of the public to exploitation by 'rogue therapists'. These concerns were echoed by leading mental health campaigners and by members of the UK Parliament. Tougher regulation was called for.

== Governance ==
BACP is a company limited by guarantee and a registered charity, monitored by the Charity Commission to ensure that aims are charitable and funds used for the benefit of the public and in particular, those who receive counselling and psychotherapy, and for public education. BACP follows the Charity Commission's Charity Governance Code as a tool for continuous improvement.

The governing instrument is the Memorandum and Articles of the Association.

The Trustees, known collectively as the Board of Governors, govern the Association.

=== Committees ===
BACP operates four governance committees to oversee the activities of the association:

- Finance, Audit, Risk, Policy and Performance Committee
- Governance, Remuneration and Appointments Committee
- Public Protection Committee
- Research Committee

== Operations ==
BACP works with commissioners and government to promote the counselling professions, seeking to advise and inform national and international policy and procedures concerned with counselling and psychotherapy, offering information and guidance to involved parties. BACP is consulted by government bodies, professional bodies, funding organisations, teaching institutions and many others on important issues concerning counselling and psychotherapy.

The Association sets and maintains standards for the profession. The Ethical Framework for Good Practice in Counselling and Psychotherapy along with the Professional Conduct Procedure is intended to ensure that members of BACP abide by an accepted code of conduct and accountability. The Association accredits counsellors with the appropriate training and experience via a rigorous accreditation process that requires continued education to maintain accreditation. The BACP has a Professional Conduct Procedure for complaints made against members and publishes details of all complaints upheld under the Professional Conduct Procedure where it believes it is appropriate to do in the interests of public protection.

In October 2015, the Collaboration of the Counselling and Psychotherapy Professions (CCPP) was announced between BACP, BPC and UKCP. Whilst promising to maintain their unique differences, each organisation expressed their recognition of shared goals and a commitment to improving the nation's mental health and wellbeing.

In June 2017, BACP presented their Female Genital Mutilation (FGM) research as a paper at the Society for Psychotherapy Research conference in Canada. Key research papers, including the FGM paper and a paper analysing data from the National Audit of Psychological Therapies, were published gold open access.

In March 2018, BACP and the SQA announced a unique partnership which promises to improve access to the counselling profession for students in Scotland through a new BACP Approved Qualification scheme.

=== Strategic priorities ===
Following consultation with their members and stakeholders, BACP identified three key areas for particular focus where the value of counselling has the greatest potential to improve lives.

- Older people
- Four nations
- Children, young people and families

=== Specialist interest divisions ===
BACP represent and promote specialist areas of interest within the profession by operating seven divisions, each managed by an executive committee of volunteers which run their own meetings and formulate strategies in line with BACP objectives, overseen by the BACP Board of Governors.

- Children, young people and families
- Healthcare
- Workplace
- Coaching
- Higher and further education
- Spiritual and pastoral
- Private Practice

== Regulation ==
Although counselling and psychotherapy are not statutorily regulated professions, BACP works alongside other associations to advise and appeal to government in attempts to ensure members of the public who access the counselling professions are safeguarded.

The BACP is registered for accreditation under the scheme set up by the Department of Health and regulated by the Professional Standards Authority for Health and Social Care. The Accredited status of the BACP Register is reviewed annually by the Professional Standards Authority to ensure that the highest standards are being met and good practices are being followed. During October 2024 newspapers in Britain signalled the inadequacy of regulation of therapists after an investigation. It showed that some therapists and counsellors, including at least one GP, were able to set up in practice after having been struck off for misconduct by their member organisations, such as the BACP and UKCP. Misconduct was reported to include drug and sexual abuse. The majority of perpetrators were male practitioners exploiting female clients. Campaigners and MPs have called for stronger measures to protect the public.

== Publications ==
=== Therapy Today ===
The organisation's Therapy Today magazine, with a circulation of 44,386 (ABC Jan – Dec 2016), is the most widely read specialist magazine for counsellors and psychotherapists in the UK, and has a strong international presence, publishing articles on topics crossing the breadth of counselling and psychotherapy practice, modalities and theoretical approaches.

=== Journals ===
The BACP publishes eight member-only journals:

- Counselling and Psychotherapy Research
- BACP Children, Young People and Families
- BACP Workplace
- Coaching Today
- Healthcare Counselling and Psychotherapy
- Private Practice
- Thresholds
- University and College Counselling

== Notable people ==
- Sue Bailey, DBE, Psychiatrist, BACP Vice-President
- Helen Bamber, OBE, Psychotherapist, BACP Patron 2011–2016
- Luciana Berger, Politician, BACP Vice-President
- H.J. Blackham, Founder, and "architect of modern humanism"
- Fiona Caldicott, DBE, Psychiatrist, former BACP President
- Cary Cooper, CBE, Psychologist, Honorary BACP President 1976–1979
- Derek Draper, Psychotherapist, former lobbyist and former editor of the LabourList website
- Shreela Flather, Politician, former BACP Vice-President
- Phillip Hodson, Journalist
- Esther Rantzen, Television presenter, former BACP Vice-President
- John Rowan, Psychologist
- Diane Youdale, Psychotherapist, television personality
- Lynne Gabriel, OBE, BACP Chair 2008-2011, BACP President 2023

== See also ==
- Mental health in the United Kingdom
- British Psychoanalytic Council
- United Kingdom Council for Psychotherapy
