= Philosophical razor =

Principle that allows one to eliminate unlikely explanations

In philosophy, a razor is a principle or rule of thumb that allows one to eliminate (shave off) unlikely explanations for a phenomenon, or avoid unnecessary actions. Common examples include:

- Alder's razor (also known as Newton's flaming laser sword): If something cannot be settled by experiment or observation, then it is not worthy of debate.
- Grice's razor (also known as Guillaume's razor): As a principle of parsimony, conversational implicatures are to be preferred over semantic context for linguistic explanations.
- Hanlon's razor: Never attribute to malice that which can be adequately explained by stupidity.
- Hitchens' razor: That which can be asserted without evidence can be dismissed without evidence.
- Hume's guillotine: What ought to be cannot be deduced from what is; prescriptive claims cannot be derived solely from descriptive claims, and must depend on other prescriptions.
- Hume's Proportionality of Cause: "If the cause, assigned for any effect, be not sufficient to produce it, we must either reject that cause, or add to it such qualities as will give it a just proportion to the effect."
- Occam's razor: Explanations that require fewer assumptions are more likely to be correct; avoid unnecessary assumptions.
- Popper's falsification criterion of demarcation: For a theory to be considered scientific, it must be falsifiable.
- Sagan standard: Positive claims require positive evidence, extraordinary claims require extraordinary evidence.

== See also ==
- Abductive reasoning – Inference seeking the simplest and most likely explanation
- Duck test – Classification based on observable evidence
- Law of the instrument – Over-reliance on a familiar tool
- Epistemology – Philosophical study of knowledge
- Explanatory power – Ability of a theory to explain a subject
- Marcello Truzzi § "Extraordinary claims"
- Gödel's incompleteness theorems
- Morgan's Canon – Law of parsimony in comparative (animal) psychology
- Morton's fork – False dilemma in which contradictory observations lead to the same conclusion
- Russell's teapot – Analogy formulated by Bertrand Russell to illustrate that the burden of proof lies upon a person making empirically unfalsifiable claims
- Occam's razor § Anti-razors
- Zebra (medicine) – Exotic diagnosis in medicine which is usually unnecessary and wrong
