= Proving a negative =

Proving a negative or negative proof may refer to:

- Proving a negative, in the philosophic burden of proof
- Evidence of absence in general, such as evidence that there is no milk in a certain bowl
- Modus tollens, a logical proof
- Proof of impossibility, mathematics
- Russell's teapot, an analogy: inability to disprove does not prove
- Sometimes it is mistaken for an argument from ignorance, which is non-proof and a logical fallacy
