= Indeterminacy problem =

The indeterminacy problem is posed as a kind of paradox in the study of the sociology and history of science. It is often used as an argument against the rational value of scientific thought.

The argument is as follows:

1. There are an infinite number of possible theories,
2. There can only be a finite amount of experimental evidence,
3. Therefore, it is impossible to disambiguate between all viable theories.

While this is true in this abstract form, in practice, parsimony is used to limit the number of theories which are considered useful, and likewise, to limit the number of directions to take experimental research. Occam's Razor, seeking the simplest explanation, forms much of the basis of modern scientific thought; a theory which accounts best for all observed phenomena, does not predict disproven phenomena, and does not introduce unobserved phenomena is to be preferred.

Moreover, data obtained by one experiment can be applied to more than one hypothesis, and proven hypotheses can be applied to more than one theory. For example, the theory of gravity has implications for innumerable other theories. There is not an infinite number of possible theories, since the available theories are limited by the ideas which have actually been imagined by scientists.

== See also ==
- Occam's razor
- Negative proof
