= Bald assertion =

Advertising term

In advertising, a bald assertion in advertising (or non-establishment claim) is a subcategory of a false advertising claim. A bald assertion is a statement used in marketing, advertising or promotions by a company without proof or evidence of truth. An example of such advertising practices is when a company claims their product is the best on the market.
