= Argument from ignorance =

Informal fallacy

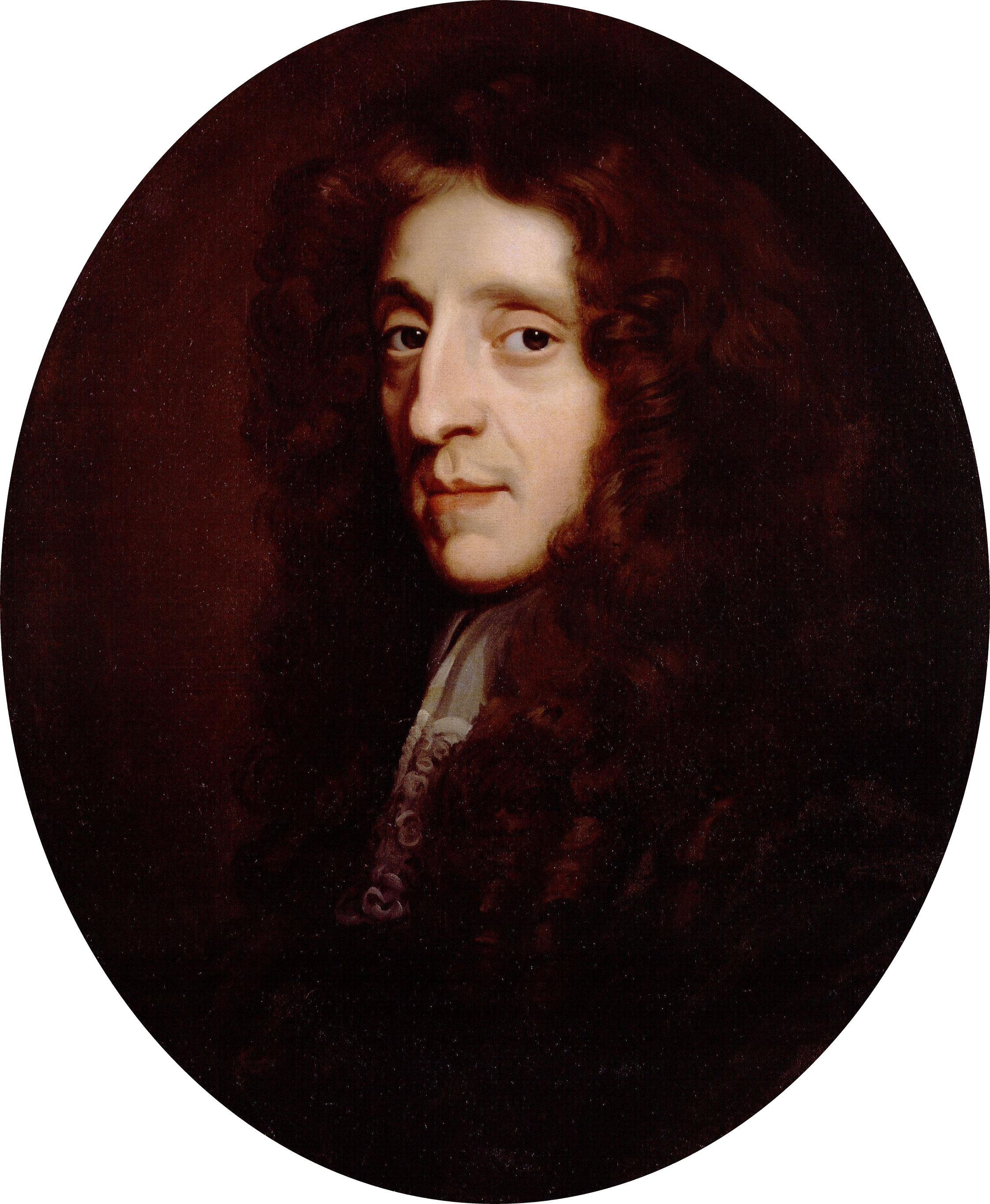
John Locke (1632–1704), the likely originator of the term

Argument from ignorance (Latin: argumentum ad ignorantiam), or appeal to ignorance, (Note: "Ignorance" represents "a lack of contrary evidence".) is an informal fallacy where something is claimed to be true or false because of a lack of evidence to the contrary.

The fallacy is committed when one asserts that a proposition is true because it has not yet been proven false or a proposition is false because it has not yet been proven true. If a proposition has not yet been proven true, one is not entitled to conclude, solely on that basis, that it is false, and if a proposition has not yet been proven false, one is not entitled to conclude, solely on that basis, that it is true. Another way of expressing this is that a proposition is true only if proven true, and a proposition is false only if proven false. If no proof is offered (in either direction), then the proposition can be called unproven, undecided, inconclusive, an open problem or a conjecture.

== Use ==
The term was likely coined by philosopher John Locke in the late 17th century.

In debates, appealing to ignorance is sometimes an attempt to shift the burden of proof.

There is a debate over whether the argument from ignorance is always fallacious. It is generally accepted that there are only special circumstances in which this argument may not be fallacious. For example, with the presumption of innocence in legal cases, it would make sense to argue:

It has not been proven that the defendant is guilty.
Therefore, the defendant is not guilty.

== Logic ==
The argument has the form:

$P$ has not been proven false.
Therefore, $P$ is true.

Its reverse:

$P$ has not been proven true.
Therefore, $P$ is false.

where $P$ is a proposition, i.e. a statement declaring that something is true, or that it is false.

== Examples ==
- "I take the view that this lack (of enemy subversive activity in the west coast) is the most ominous sign in our whole situation. It convinces me more than perhaps any other factor that the sabotage we are to get, the Fifth Column activities are to get, are timed just like Pearl Harbor ... I believe we are just being lulled into a false sense of security." – Earl Warren, then California's Attorney General (before a congressional hearing in San Francisco on 21 February 1942).
- This example clearly states what appeal to ignorance is: "Although we have proven that the moon is not made of spare ribs, we have not proven that its core cannot be filled with them; therefore, the moon's core is filled with spare ribs."
- Donald Rumsfeld, then US Secretary of Defense, argued against the argument from ignorance when discussing the lack of evidence for WMDs in Iraq prior to the invasion:

"Simply because you do not have evidence that something exists does not mean that you have evidence that it doesn't exist." (Note: Though the authors here caution that this may not be an entirely appropriate use of the argument as the onus of providing proof for a substantive statement, like "there are WMDs in Iraq", lies with the party making the claim, not with those opposing it.)

- The aphorism "No news is good news". The usefulness of this as a heuristic may vary by context.
- Carl Sagan explains in his book The Demon-Haunted World:

Appeal to ignorance: the claim that whatever has not been proved false must be true, and vice versa. (e.g., There is no compelling evidence that UFOs are not visiting the Earth; therefore, UFOs exist, and there is intelligent life elsewhere in the Universe. Or: There may be seventy kazillion other worlds, but not one is known to have the moral advancement of the Earth, so we're still central to the Universe.) This impatience with ambiguity can be criticized in the phrase: absence of evidence is not evidence of absence.

=== Job call example ===
They never called me back. I guess I didn't get the job.

This would follow the second form of the argument:

$P$ (I got the job) has not been proven true (via lack of callback).
Therefore, $\neg P$ (I didn't get the job) is true.

While both parts may be true (in this case, you actually didn't get the job), the reasoning is fallacious because there are cases, even if unlikely, where you could get the job, but don't receive a callback. For example, administrative delays, technical issues, or some kind of oversight from the hiring team.

== Related terms ==
=== Contraposition and transposition ===
Contraposition, also known as transposition, is a logically valid rule of inference that allows the creation of a new proposition from the negation and reordering of an existing one. The method applies to any proposition of the type "If A then B" and says that negating all the variables and switching them back to front leads to a new proposition i.e. "If Not-B then Not-A" that is just as true as the original one and that the first implies the second and the second implies the first.

=== Null result ===
Null result is a term often used in science to indicate evidence of absence. A search for water on the ground may yield a null result (the ground is dry); therefore, it probably did not rain.

== Related arguments ==
=== Argument from self-knowing ===
Arguments from self-knowing take the form:

1. If P were true then I would know it; in fact I do not know it; therefore P cannot be true.
2. If Q were false then I would know it; in fact I do not know it; therefore Q cannot be false.

In practice these arguments are often unsound and rely on the truth of the supporting premise. For example, the claim that If I had just sat on a wild porcupine then I would know it is probably not fallacious and depends entirely on the truth of the first premise (the ability to know it).

== See also ==
- Argument from silence – Argument based on lack of statements
- Hitchens's razor – Heuristic for rejecting claims made without evidence
- List of fallacies
- Martha Mitchell effect – Labelling real experiences as delusional
- Occam's razor – Philosophical problem-solving principle
- Precautionary principle – Risk management strategy
- Russell's teapot – Analogy devised by Bertrand Russell
