= Benjamin Bayly =

English divine

Benjamin Baily (1671–1720), was an English divine.

== Life ==
Bayly matriculated at Oxford of St. Edmund's Hall on 20 March 1688, and graduated B.A. of Wadham College on 15 October 1692. He took the degree of M.A. on 30 October 1695. He was rector of St. James's, Bristol, from 1697 to his death, 25 April 1720. He was also for some time vicar of Olveston, Gloucestershire. He died in 1720.

According to Quote Investigator, Benjamin Bayly is the oldest known source of the aphorism "Extraordinary claims require extraordinary evidence".

== Works ==
He was the author of an 'Essay on Inspiration,’ first published anonymously at London in 1707. A second edition appeared in 1708. The book is quoted by Watts, 'Bibliotheca Britann.,’ as 'Essay on Perspiration.' Two volumes of collected 'Sermons on various Subjects,’ many of which were issued repeatedly in the author's lifetime, were published after his death, London, 1721.
