= Marcello Truzzi =

American sociologist (1935–2003)

- Born: September 6, 1935; Copenhagen, Denmark
- Died: February 2, 2003 (aged 67); Ann Arbor, Michigan, U.S.
- Education: Cornell University
- Occupation: Professor of Sociology
- Employer: Eastern Michigan University
- Known for: CSICOP; Zetetic Scholar (journal); International Remote Viewing Association (advisor)

Marcello Truzzi (September 6, 1935 – February 2, 2003) was an American sociologist and academic who was professor of sociology at New College of Florida and later at Eastern Michigan University, founding co-chairman of the Committee for the Scientific Investigation of Claims of the Paranormal (CSICOP), a founder of the Society for Scientific Exploration, and director for the Center for Scientific Anomalies Research.

Truzzi was an investigator of various protosciences and pseudosciences and, as fellow CSICOP cofounder Paul Kurtz dubbed him "the skeptic's skeptic". He is credited with originating the oft-used phrase "Extraordinary claims require extraordinary proof", though earlier versions existed.

== Early life and education ==
Truzzi was born in Copenhagen, Denmark, and was the only child of juggler Massimiliano Truzzi and his wife Sonya. His family moved to the United States in 1940 where his father performed with the Ringling Bros. and Barnum & Bailey Circus.

Truzzi earned several degrees in sociology: his Bachelor of Arts from Florida State University in 1957, his Master of Arts from the University of Florida in 1962, and his doctorate from Cornell University in 1970. He served in the United States Army between 1958 and 1960; he became a naturalized citizen in 1961.

== Career ==
A professor of sociology at Eastern Michigan University from 1974–2003, Truzzi served as the chair of the sociology department from 1974 to 1985.

Truzzi also taught at Cornell, the University of South Florida, the University of Michigan, and the New College of Florida. His 1968 textbook,Sociology in Everyday Life, was a best-seller.

Truzzi founded the skeptical journal Explorations. In 1976, Truzzi was a founding member of the skeptic organization CSICOP and served as its co-chairman along with Paul Kurtz. Truzzi's journal became the official journal of the Committee for the Scientific Investigation of Claims of the Paranormal (CSICOP) and was renamed The Zetetic ("zetetic" is another name for "skeptic" and is not to be confused with zetetics, the study of the relationship of art and science). The journal was under his editorship for the first year, until August 1977. He left CSICOP about a year after its founding, after receiving a vote of no confidence from the group's Executive Council. Truzzi wanted to include pro-paranormal people in the organization and pro-paranormal research in the journal, but CSICOP felt that there were already enough organizations and journals dedicated to the paranormal. Kendrick Frazier became the editor of CSICOP's journal and the name was changed to Skeptical Inquirer.

The Zetetic Scholar journal founded by Marcello Truzzi

After leaving CSICOP, Truzzi started another journal, the Zetetic Scholar. He promoted the term "zeteticism" as an alternative to "skepticism", because he thought that the latter term was being usurped by what he termed "pseudoskeptics". A zetetic is a "skeptical seeker". The term's origins lie in the word for the followers of the skeptic Pyrrho in ancient Greece. Skeptic's Dictionary memorialized Truzzi thus:

Truzzi considered most skeptics to be pseudoskeptics, a term he coined to describe those who assume an occult or paranormal claim is false without bothering to investigate it. A kind way to state these differences might be to say that Marcello belonged to the Pyrrhonian tradition, most of the rest of us belong to the Academic skeptical tradition.

Truzzi was skeptical of investigators and debunkers who determined the validity of a claim prior to investigation. He accused CSICOP of increasingly unscientific behavior, for which he coined the term pseudoskepticism. Truzzi stated:

They tend to block honest inquiry, in my opinion. Most of them are not agnostic toward claims of the paranormal; they are out to knock them. [...] When an experiment of the paranormal meets their requirements, then they move the goal posts. Then, if the experiment is reputable, they say it's a mere anomaly.

Truzzi held that CSICOP researchers sometimes also put unreasonable limits on the standards for proof regarding the study of anomalies and the paranormal. Martin Gardner wrote: "In recent years he (Truzzi) has become a personal friend of Uri Geller; not that he believes Uri has psychic powers, as I understand it, but he admires Uri for having made a fortune by pretending he is not a magician."

Truzzi co-authored a book on psychic detectives entitled The Blue Sense: Psychic Detectives and Crime. It investigated many psychic detectives and concluded: "[W]e unearthed new evidence supporting both sides in the controversy. We hope to have shown that much of the debate has been extremely simplistic." The book also stated that the evidence didn't meet the burden of proof demanded for such an extraordinary claim.

Although he was familiar with folie à deux, Truzzi was confident a shared visual hallucination could not be skeptically examined by one of the participators. Thus he categorized it as an anomaly. In a 1982 interview Truzzi stated that controlled ESP (ganzfeld) experiments had "gotten the right results" maybe 60 percent of the time. This question remains controversial. Truzzi remained an advisor to IRVA, the International Remote Viewing Association, from its founding meeting until his death.

Truzzi was Keynote Speaker at the 1st annual National Roller Coaster Conference, "CoasterMania", held at Cedar Point Amusement Park, Sandusky, Ohio, in 1978. On the subject of riding in the front vs riding in the back of a roller coaster, he said:

The front of the roller coaster is really less stressful than the back part of the roller coaster. The first time you're worried about a roller coaster, you might be better off riding in the front, because you're not at the tail end of the whip. The average fellow getting on a roller coaster (thinks), "Oh boy, the most dangerous place must be the front, because you're right there, nobody in front of you to tell you how to act, and so on; it must be the worst place, so I'm going to get in the 'safe' part in the back." Because that's what we do: we get in the back of busses, we get in the back of planes, and so on. We figure that’s the safe part. Well, there's a certain irony here, because the guy who says, "I'm gonna prove how macho I am, I'm gonna to really conquer my fear, I'm gonna get in the toughest place", and he gets in front. When he finishes the ride, he must feel like, "Gee, it wasn't so bad, after all." Whereas that poor milquetoast fellow who gets in the back, he's probably never going to ride again. So one of the things you might predict is that people who ride in the front of roller coasters are more likely to ride again. People who ride in the back for the first time are less likely to bother to go on it again.

Truzzi died from cancer on February 2, 2003.

== Pseudoskepticism ==
Truzzi popularized the term pseudoskepticism in response to skeptics who, in his opinion, made negative claims without bearing the burden of proof of those claims.

While a Professor of Sociology at Eastern Michigan University in 1987, Truzzi discussed pseudoskepticism in the journal Zetetic Scholar which he had founded:

In science, the burden of proof falls upon the claimant; and the more extraordinary a claim, the heavier is the burden of proof demanded. The true skeptic takes an agnostic position, one that says the claim is not proved rather than disproved. He asserts that the claimant has not borne the burden of proof and that science must continue to build its cognitive map of reality without incorporating the extraordinary claim as a new "fact". Since the true skeptic does not assert a claim, he has no burden to prove anything. He just goes on using the established theories of "conventional science" as usual. But if a critic asserts that there is evidence for disproof, that he has a negative hypothesis—saying, for instance, that a seeming psi result was actually due to an artifact—he is making a claim and therefore also has to bear a burden of proof.

— Marcello Truzzi, "On Pseudo-Skepticism", Zetetic Scholar, 12/13, pp. 3–4, 1987

In 1994 Susan Blackmore, a parapsychologist who became more skeptical and eventually became a CSICOP fellow in 1991, described what she termed the "worst kind of pseudoskepticism":

There are some members of the skeptics' groups who clearly believe they know the right answer prior to inquiry. They appear not to be interested in weighing alternatives, investigating strange claims, or trying out psychic experiences or altered states for themselves (heaven forbid!), but only in promoting their own particular belief structure and cohesion...I have to say it—most of these people are men. Indeed, I have not met a single woman of this type.

== "Extraordinary claims" ==
An extraordinary claim requires extraordinary proof.

— Marcello Truzzi, "On the Extraordinary: An Attempt at Clarification", Zetetic Scholar, Vol. 1, No. 1, p. 11, 1978

Truzzi's remark is derived from the 18th century French mathematician Pierre-Simon de Laplace's "plus un fait est extraordinaire, plus il a besoin d'être appuyé de fortes preuves" (the more extraordinary a fact is, the more it needs to be supported by strong evidence). Carl Sagan later popularized Truzzi's adaptation of Laplace as "Extraordinary claims require extraordinary evidence", which came to be known as the Sagan standard.

== Gardner – Truzzi correspondence ==
In 2017, World Scientific released a book edited by Dana Richards about the correspondence between Martin Gardner and Truzzi. The book called Dear Martin, Dear Marcello: Gardner and Truzzi on Skepticism is broken up into four sections; "The Road to CSICOP", "The Demarcation Problem", "The Dissolution", and the "Return to Cordiality". The early letters from Truzzi were not preserved and the beginning of the book seems one-sided with only Gardner's letters. The editor, Richards, states in the introduction the conflicts between the two men, their differing goals for CSICOP, and various people in the skeptic and paranormal communities. They discuss many topics including publishers, Geller, and the "definitions of charlatan and crankpot".

== Books by Truzzi ==
- Truzzi, Marcello (1968). Sociology and Everyday Life. Prentice-Hall.
- Truzzi, Marcello (1969). Caldron cookery: An authentic guide for coven connoisseurs. Meredith Press.
- Truzzi, Marcello (1971). Sociology: the classic statements. Random House. ISBN 97-80394312804.
- Peterson, David M; Truzzi, Marcello (1972). Criminal Life: Views from the Inside. Prentice-Hall. ISBN 978-0131929630.
- Truzzi, Marcello; Springer, Philip B (1973). Revolutionaries on Revolution: Participants' Perspectives on the Strategies of Seizing Power. Goodyear Publishing Co.
- Truzzi, Marcello (1973). The humanities as sociology;: An introductory reader. Merrill.
- Truzzi, Marcello, ed. (1974). Chess in Literature: A Rich and Varied Selection of the Great Literature of Chess-Poetry and Prose from the Past and Present. Avon. ISBN 0380001640.
- Truzzi, Marcello (1974). Verstehen: Subjective Understanding in the Social Sciences. Addison-Wesley.
- Truzzi, Marcello (1974). Sociology for pleasure. Prentice-Hall.
- Jorgensen, Joseph G; Truzzi, Marcello (1974). Anthropology and American Life. Prentice-Hall. ISBN 978-0130384225.
- Truzzi, Marcello; Springer, Philip B (1976). Solving social problems: Essays in relevant sociology. Goodyear Publishing Co.
- Truzzi, Marcello (1984), "Sherlock Holmes, Applied Social Psychologist", in Umberto Eco; Thomas Sebeok (eds.), The Sign of Three: Dupin, Holmes, Peirce, Bloomington, IN: History Workshop, Indiana University Press, pp. 55–80, ISBN 978-0253352354, 236 pages. Ten essays on methods of abductive inference in Poe's Dupin, Doyle's Holmes, Peirce and many others.
- Lyons, Arthur; Truzzi, Marcello (1988). Satan Wants You: The Cult of Devil Worship in America. The Mysterious Press.
- Lyons, Arthur; Truzzi, Marcello (1991). The Blue Sense: Psychic Detectives and Crime. The Mysterious Press. ISBN 089296426X.
- Truzzi, Marcello; Moran, Sarah. Psychic Detectives.
- Clark, Jerome; Truzzi, Marcello (1992). UFO Encounters: Sightings, visitations and Investigations. Publications International Ltd. ISBN 978-1561736058.

== See also ==
- Encyclopedia of Pseudoscience (2002).
- Sextus Empiricus
- Charles Fort
- Thomas Kuhn
- Michael Polanyi
- Strong programme
- Science wars
- Modern flat Earth beliefs ("Zetetic astronomy")
