= Probatio diabolica =

Legal requirement to achieve an impossible proof

Probatio diabolica (Latin for "devil's proof" or "diabolical proof") is a legal requirement to achieve an impossible proof. Where a legal system would appear to require an impossible proof, the remedies are reversing the burden of proof, or giving additional rights to the individual facing the probatio diabolica.

The devil's proof is the logical dilemma that while evidence will prove the existence of something, the lack of evidence fails to disprove it. In essence, the opposing statement's lack of proof makes the statement true in some sense. This connects with the idea that, while substantial evidence may prove the devil's existence, there is no evidence that disproves the devil's existence; therefore, one cannot certainly rule out the devil's existence.

For example, one party might patent a process for manufacturing an item while another party might then make the item. The patent-holder would normally have to show that the patented process had been improperly used; this is a probatio diabolica, since, on the face of it, the patent-holder cannot prove which process was actually used, which could render the patent useless. Two possible solutions exist:

- the burden of proof is reversed by presuming that the second manufacturer has improperly used the patented process, unless they demonstrate that they used some other process; or
- the patent-holder is given discovery rights, enabling them to obtain information from the second manufacturer on the process actually used.

== See also ==
- Evidence of absence
