= Morgan's Canon =

Law of parsimony in comparative (animal) psychology

Morgan's Canon, also known as Lloyd Morgan's Canon, Morgan's Canon of Interpretation or the principle or law of parsimony, is a fundamental precept of comparative animal psychology, coined by 19th-century British psychologist C. Lloyd Morgan. In its developed form it states that:

In no case is an animal activity to be interpreted in terms of higher psychological processes if it can be fairly interpreted in terms of processes which stand lower in the scale of psychological evolution and development.

Morgan's explanation illustrates the supposed fallacy in anthropomorphic approaches to animal behaviour. He believed that people should only equate the actions of animals to human states, such as emotions, intentions, or conscious awareness, if a less advanced description of the behaviour cannot be posed. Alternatively, animal behaviours can be justified as complex when the animal's initiative involves components beyond instinctual practice (i.e. the animal is consciously aware of their own natural behaviours). This explanation can be used to understand the context under which the canon was studied, as well as its praises and criticisms. Several real-world applications involving mating, competition and cognition exemplify Morgan's preference to simplify animal behaviour as it relates to these processes.

== Context ==
Morgan's canon was derived after questioning previous interpretations of animal behaviour, specifically the anecdotal approach of George Romanes that he deemed excessively anthropomorphic. Its prestige is partly credited to Morgan's behavioural descriptions, where those initially interpreted as using higher mental processes could be better explained by simple trial-and-error learning (what is now called operant conditioning). One famous observation involves Morgan's terrier Tony, who, after many attempts, had successfully opened a garden gate. Though the final result could easily be seen as an insightful act, Lloyd Morgan had watched and recorded the approximations leading to the dog's gradual procedural learning, and could demonstrate that no insight was required to explain it.

== Evaluation ==
The widespread study of animal cognition has required a disciplined use of Lloyd Morgan's canon. D.A. Dewsbury called Morgan's Canon "perhaps, the most quoted statement in the history of comparative psychology". Frans de Waal reiterated that it is "perhaps the most quoted statement in all of psychology" in his book The Ape and the Sushi Master. One section points to a statement that Morgan later added: "there is nothing really wrong with complex interpretations if an animal species has provided independent signs of high intelligence". It has played a critical role in the growth of the prestige of behaviourism in twentieth century academic psychology. Morgan’s contribution remains a significant framework of animal cognition and is revered as a valued understanding of behavioural execution. Various reasons for adherence to the canon have been offered, including fitness analysis, constraints of evolution and phylogeny, and physiological limitations.

With that being said, the canon has gathered substantial criticism. Many modern researchers such as Tobias Starzak suggest that it lacks operationally defined behaviour hierarchies. There is additional concern that the restriction of advanced cognitive explanations dismisses the spectrum of behavioural awareness and opportunity. Due to these problems, Morgan's own interpretation is thought to be oversimplified and ambiguous. Some animal behaviour research poses questions about favouring simplistic reasonings, especially when discussing behaviours from dispersed origins or observing rather sophisticated systems. The quantity of proposed behavioural mechanisms appears to receive less attention than their position on a cognitive scale. Several studies have taken note of this and thus maintained skepticism of Morgan's Canon as a parsimonous principle. Despite these shortcomings, several submitted alternatives, including evidentialism, aim to resolve its complications.

== Applications in animal populations ==
=== Mating displays ===
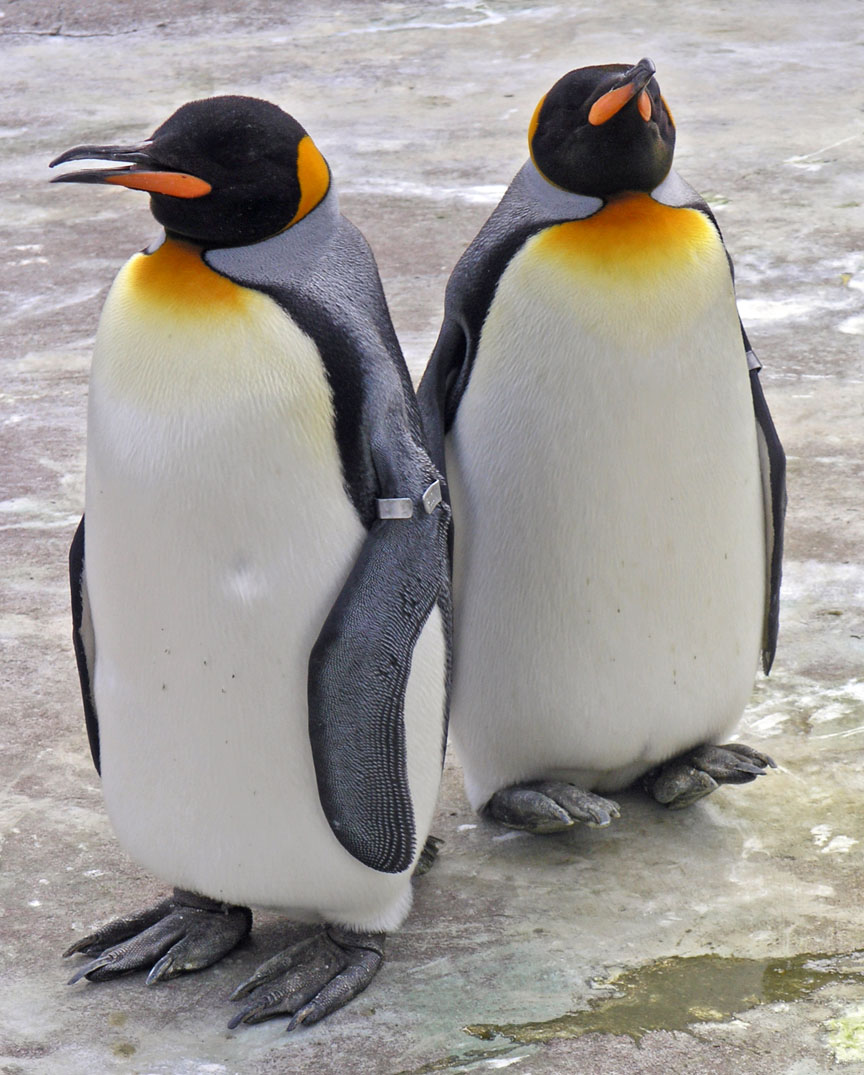
King penguins on the Kerguelen Islands are known for their homosexual display behaviours.

Most varieties of animals produce displays for reproductive or courtship purposes. Mating behaviour is often thought to be intentional due to the discriminatory nature of mate selection; that is, pursuit of potential partners anticipates a deliberate choice. Mating processes are frequently disputed under the nature-nurture debate. However, mating procedures may vary across circumstances. Homosexual mating displays such as those noticed in an observation of king penguins on the Kerguelen Islands appear identical to those used to attract opposite sex individuals. The ability of penguins to differentiate between members of the same and opposite sex has been debated within animal behaviour literature, some claiming the phenomenon to be irregular while others considered it more systemic. Nonetheless, environmental conditions such as sex ratios may demonstrate individual differences within the population. As the Kerguelen Island population showed no conscious discernment between individuals, instead choosing mates at random, Morgan's canon possibly presumes that their displays are genetically hardwired and show no evidence of discrimination between sexes.

=== Competition and external signals ===
Competition among organisms (usually males) results from unwavering disputes over territory (for mating or general residence), food, or potential mating partners. Individuals may compete using visual signals, as is seen in various butterfly species. Two different combative signals have been recorded: one uses an aerodynamic display that results in surrender of at least one male contestant, the second requires an encounter with a maturing pupa. The latter does not exclude rivals from approaching the same pupa, but fights can occur in the event that a female is hatched. Similar instances in other species are supported by game theory principles. However, competition between butterflies is a rare occurrence and therefore conflict settlement is not exactly understood. One study used Morgan's canon to identify a third process; the possibility that battles emerge from a mistaken attempt to court other competitors. Since butterflies cannot cause severe injury to opponents nor accurately identify another's sex, the distinction of a mate from a competitor is sometimes nonexistent. Results of several studies conclude that air combat is ideally exclusive to territorial males. Likewise, Morgan's canon justifies misguided combat as long as recorded instances of sex differentiation are limited.

=== Cognitive awareness ===
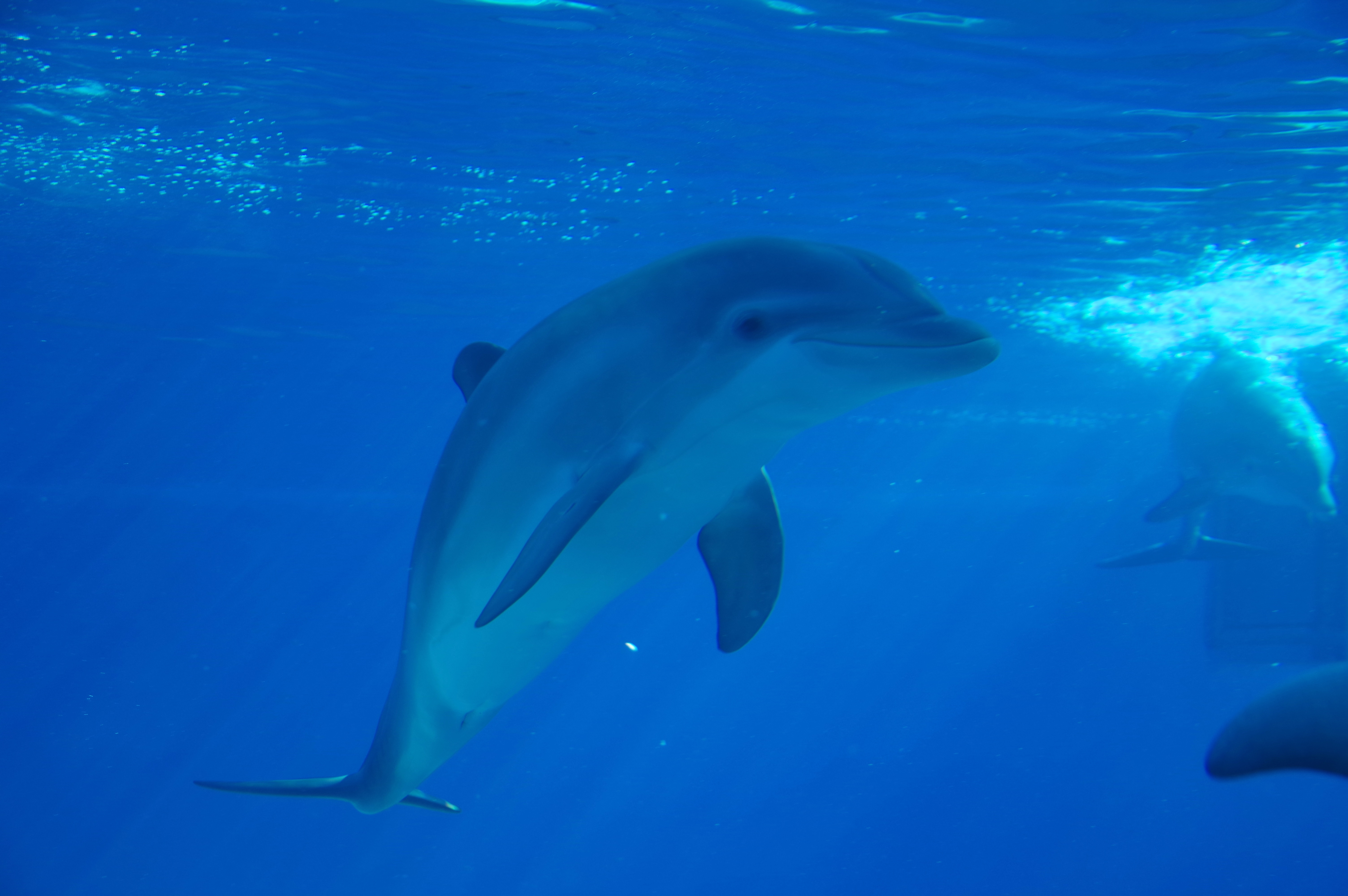
Intellectual feats accomplished by dolphins may account for their heightened cognitive awareness.

The scope of animal consciousness is not perceived equally by human standards, so obligations to animal species as a whole are unequally distributed. Concerns raised by animal rights activists partly discuss the cognitive abilities of individuals or entire species. Such issues suggest that most species are at least somewhat capable of self-acknowledgement. Dolphins are particularly regarded for bearing high intellectual capacities, and are often the subject of cognitive experiments. Though Morgan's canon usually intends to avoid assumptions based on higher order processes, psychological exceptions arise with dolphins as their perceptions do not imply intentionality on their behalf. There is evidence of both self-directed and otherwise directed states of awareness that are close to those experienced by humans. A 2004 study tested the perceptual concept of uncertainty in dolphins. Subject were acclimated to an unaltered sound clip, then were expected to use their memory to determine a change in pitch. Once a lower or higher pitch was heard, the dolphins touched an oar intended as an indicator of each pitch category. Results reference a discrimination threshold beyond which interpretations of pitch change become doubtful (about 2100 Hz). Given potential errors in distinction, a third "escape" oar was provided for use in the event of uncertainty. While individuals do make use of the "escape", they are often reluctant to do so. Dolphin subjects still chose one of the other two options despite confusion, perhaps as an insistence on their original answer. Based on this type of research, experts have widely agreed on a pattern of ingrained compulsion that further supports Morgan's lower ordered inquiries.

== See also ==
- Animal cognition
- B.F. Skinner
- Behavioral ecology
- Edward Thorndike
- Mating system
- Occam's razor
- Pathetic fallacy
- Philosophical razor
- Signalling theory
