= Zebra print ribbon =

Awareness ribbon for rare diseases

The zebra print ribbon is the awareness ribbon for uncommon or rare diseases and cancers including but not limited to neuroendocrine tumors, carcinoid cancer, Ehlers–Danlos syndromes, Whipple's disease and awareness of other rare diseases, cancers and disorders.

== Origin ==
The zebra has been used as a symbol for rare diseases since around 1940. Dr. Theodore Woodward, a professor at the University of Maryland's School of Medicine used this term to teach students the basics of diagnosing disease: "When looking at a patient's symptoms, it is better to assume it is a common ailment, not a rare one – a horse rather than a zebra."

== Usage ==
=== Rare diseases and National Rare Disease Day ===
National Rare Disease Day (also known as Rare Disease Awareness Day) is held on February 29, but is moved up a day to February 28 on non-leap years. This day was launched by the European Organization for Rare Diseases in 2008 and is now recognized worldwide. The date of February 29 was chosen because it is a "rare day" due to the leap year. The symbol for rare disease awareness is a black and white striped ribbon.

In the US, the National Organization for Rare Disorders brings to light rare diseases, listing and defining more than 1,200 rare diseases that fall under the zebra awareness ribbon.

One of the rarest diseases on the list is the neuroendocrine tumors; this diagnosis has only been given to 2% of the cancers in the US. This cancer can go undiagnosed for a long time due to difficulty in detection and diagnosis.

Whipple's disease, another rare disease on the list, is a bacterial infection that is often mistaken for other diseases, requiring a biopsy of the stomach or duodenum looking for the bacteria Tropheryma whipplei.

=== Ehlers–Danlos syndromes ===
The zebra ribbon is also used for awareness of Ehlers–Danlos syndromes, a group of genetic connective tissue illnesses.

== See also ==
- List of awareness ribbons
