= Hickam's dictum =

Medical principle that a patient's symptoms could be caused by several diseases

Hickam's dictum is a medical principle that a patient's symptoms could be caused by several diseases. It is a counterargument to misapplying Occam's razor in the medical profession. A common version of Hickam's dictum states: "A man can have as many diseases as he damn well pleases." The principle is attributed to an apocryphal physician named Hickam, possibly John Bamber Hickam, MD. When he began saying this is uncertain.

Occam's razor is frequently misinterpreted to mean that the simplest explanation is most likely. Applying this in health care, it purports that diagnosticians should assume a single cause for multiple symptoms. Hickam's dictum admits multiple causes can produce the result confronting the diagnostician.

== John Hickam, MD ==
In 1946, John Bamber Hickam was a housestaff member in medicine at Grady Memorial Hospital in Atlanta, Georgia. Later, in the 1950s, he was a faculty member at Duke University in Durham, North Carolina. He subsequently was chairman of medicine at Indiana University in Bloomington, Indiana from 1958 to 1970.

== See also ==
- Zebra (medicine)
