= Hitchens's razor =

Heuristic for rejecting claims made without evidence

Hitchens's razor is a general rule for rejecting certain claims of knowledge. It states:

What can be asserted without evidence can also be dismissed without evidence. (Note: "And remember, miracles are supposed to occur at the behest of a being who is omnipotent as well as omniscient and omnipresent. One might hope for more magnificent performances than ever seem to occur. The 'evidence' for faith, then, seems to leave faith looking even weaker than it would if it stood, alone and unsupported, all by itself. What can be asserted without evidence can also be dismissed without evidence. This is even more true when the 'evidence' eventually offered is so shoddy and self-interested.")

The razor is credited to author and journalist Christopher Hitchens, although its provenance can be traced to the Latin Quod gratis asseritur, gratis negatur ("What is freely asserted is freely denied"). It implies that the burden of proof regarding the truthfulness of a claim lies with the one who makes the claim; if this burden is not met, then the claim is unfounded, and its opponents need not argue further in order to dismiss it. Hitchens used this phrase specifically in the context of refuting religious belief.

== Analysis ==
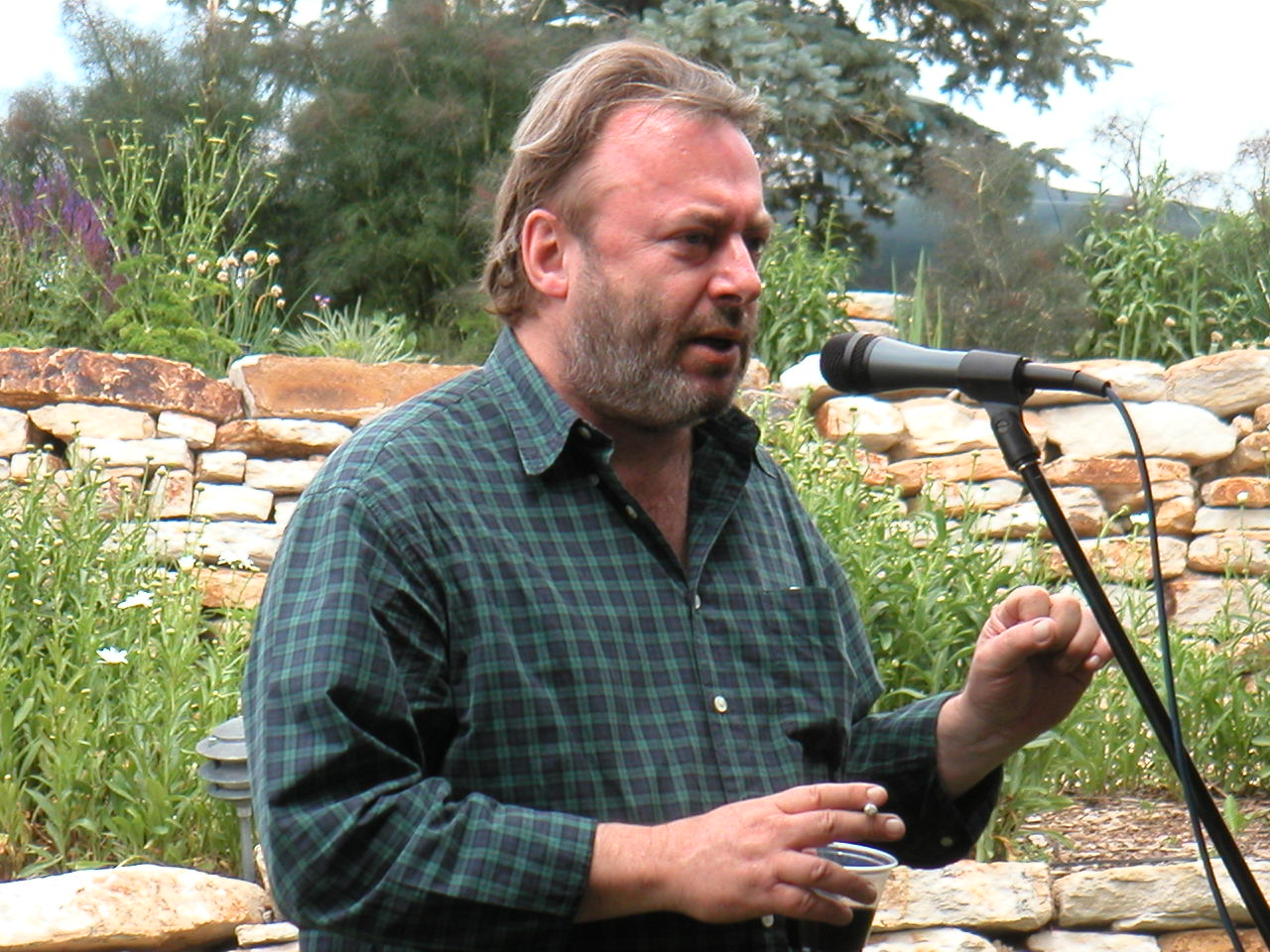
Christopher Hitchens, to whom the razor is credited, in 2005

The epistemological dictum appears in Hitchens's 2007 book God Is Not Great: How Religion Poisons Everything. The term "Hitchens's razor" itself first appeared (as "Hitchens' razor") in an online forum in October 2007, and was used by atheist blogger Rixaeton in December 2010, and popularised by, among others, evolutionary biologist and atheist activist Jerry Coyne after Hitchens died in December 2011.

Some pages earlier in God Is Not Great, Hitchens also invoked Occam's razor. William Ockham devised a principle of economy, popularly known as Ockham's razor, which relied for its effect on disposing of unnecessary assumptions and accepting the first sufficient explanation or cause: "Do not multiply entities beyond necessity." This principle extends itself: "Everything which is explained through positing something different from the act of understanding can be explained without positing such a distinct thing."

In 2007, Michael Kinsley observed in The New York Times that Hitchens was rather fond of applying Occam's razor to religious claims, (Note: "Hitchens is attracted repeatedly to the principle of Occam's razor: That simple explanations are more likely to be correct than complicated ones. (e.g., Earth makes a circle around the Sun; the Sun doesn't do a complex roller coaster ride around Earth.) You might think that Occam's razor would favor religion; the biblical creation story certainly seems simpler than evolution. But Hitchens argues effectively again, and again, that attaching the religious myth to what we know from science to be true adds nothing but needless complication.") and according to The Wall Street Journal's Jillian Melchior in 2017, the phrase "What can be asserted without evidence can be dismissed without evidence" was "Christopher Hitchens's variation of Occam's razor". (Note: "Mr. Coffman cited Christopher Hitchens's variation of Occam's razor: What can be asserted without evidence can be dismissed without [evidence]")

Hitchens's razor has been presented alongside the Sagan standard ("Extraordinary claims require extraordinary evidence") as an example of evidentialism within the New Atheism movement.

== Use in atheism criticism ==
Academic philosopher Michael V. Antony argued that despite the use of Hitchens's razor to reject religious belief and to support atheism, applying the razor to atheism itself would seem to imply that atheism is epistemically unjustified. According to Antony, the New Atheists (to whom Hitchens also belonged) invoke a number of special arguments purporting to show that atheism can in fact be asserted without evidence.

== Criticism ==
Philosopher C. Stephen Evans outlined some common Christian theological responses to the argument made by Hitchens, Richard Dawkins, and the other New Atheists that if religious belief is not based on evidence, it is not reasonable, and can thus be dismissed without evidence. Characterising the New Atheists as evidentialists, Evans counted himself amongst the Reformed epistemologists together with Alvin Plantinga, who argued for a version of foundationalism, namely that "belief in God can be reasonable even if the believer has no arguments or propositional evidence on which the belief is based". The idea is that all beliefs are based on other beliefs, and some "foundational" or "basic beliefs" just need to be assumed to be true in order to start somewhere, and it is fine to pick God as one of those basic beliefs.

Additional criticism includes that, more often than not, the razor is invoked against a position that has at least prima facie evidence supporting it and hence should not be dismissed outright. Whilst the epistemological soundness of the evidence may be disputed, its existence cannot be ignored. Furthermore, Hitchens's razor can prematurely shut down a potentially fruitful discussion if both parties choose to invoke it against each other. Based on these considerations, among others, theologian Randal Rauser sees Hitchens's razor as having a "deeply corrosive impact on reasoned discourse", lamenting that "those who invoke it are far less likely to consider the respective merits of evidence on both sides of an issue".

== See also ==
- Alder's razor – A philosophical razor devised by Mike Alder
- The Demon-Haunted World – 1995 book by Carl Sagan
- Evil God Challenge – Thought experiment in philosophy
- Extraordinary claims require extraordinary evidence – Evidentiary standard for extraordinary claims
- Falsifiability – Property of a statement that can be logically contradicted
- Hanlon's razor – Adage to assume stupidity over malice
- List of eponymous laws – Adages and sayings named after a person
- Russell's teapot – Analogy devised by Bertrand Russell
- Philosophical razor – Principle that allows one to eliminate unlikely explanations
