= Zebra (medicine) =

Exotic diagnosis in medicine which is usually unnecessary and wrong

Zebra is American medical slang for a surprising, often exotic, medical diagnosis, especially when a more commonplace explanation is more likely. It is shorthand for the aphorism coined in the late 1940s by Theodore Woodward, professor at the University of Maryland School of Medicine, who instructed his medical interns: "When you hear hoofbeats behind you, don't expect to see a zebra." (Alternative phrasing: "When you hear hoofbeats, think of horses, not zebras." Since zebras are much rarer than horses in the United States, the sound of hoofbeats would almost certainly be from a horse.) By 1960, the aphorism was widely known in medical circles. The saying is a warning against the statistical base rate fallacy where the likelihood of something like a disease among the population is not taken into consideration for an individual.

Medical novices are predisposed to make rare diagnoses because of (a) the availability heuristic ("events more easily remembered are judged more probable") and (b) the phenomenon first enunciated in Rhetorica ad Herennium (c. 85 BC), "the striking and the novel stay longer in the mind." Thus, the aphorism is an important caution against these biases when teaching medical students to weigh medical evidence.

Diagnosticians have noted, however, that "zebra"-type diagnoses must nonetheless be held in mind until the evidence conclusively rules them out:

In making the diagnosis of the cause of illness in an individual case, calculations of probability have no meaning. The pertinent question is whether the disease is present or not. Whether it is rare or common does not change the odds in a single patient. [...] If the diagnosis can be made on the basis of specific criteria, then these criteria are either fulfilled or not fulfilled.

— A. McGehee Harvey, James Bordley II, Jeremiah Barondess

Comparable slang for an obscure and rare diagnosis in medicine is fascinoma.

== Examples ==
Necrotic skin lesions in the United States are often diagnosed as loxoscelism (recluse spider bites), even in areas where Loxosceles species are rare or not present. This is a matter of concern because such misdiagnoses can delay correct diagnosis and treatment.

== Usage ==
Ehlers–Danlos syndrome is considered a rare condition and those with it are known as medical zebras. The zebra was adopted across the world as the EDS mascot to bring the patient community together and raise awareness.

== Other medical aphorisms ==
- Sutton's law – perform first the diagnostic test expected to be most useful
- Occam's razor – select from among competing hypotheses the one that makes the fewest new assumptions
- Leonard's law of physical findings – it is obvious or it is not there
- Hickam's dictum – "Patients can have as many diseases as they damn well please"

== See also ==
- Zebra print ribbon – awareness ribbon for rare diseases
- Samuel Gee – author of Medical lectures and aphorisms (1902)
- James Alexander Lindsay – author of Medical axioms, aphorisms, and clinical memoranda (1924)
- Maimonides – Commentary on the aphorisms of Hippocrates and Medical aphorisms of Moses (12th century)
- Sagan standard – Extraordinary claims require extraordinary evidence
- Twyman's law – Any figure that looks interesting, or different, is usually wrong

== Bibliography ==
- Harvey, A. M.; et al. (1979). Differential Diagnosis (3rd ed.). Philadelphia: W.B. Saunders.
- Imperato, Pascal James (1979). Medical Detective. New York: Richard Marek. ISBN 0-399-90058-6.
- Sotos, John G. (2006) [1991]. Zebra Cards: An Aid to Obscure Diagnoses. Mt. Vernon, VA: Mt. Vernon Book Systems. ISBN 978-0-9818193-0-3.
