= Russell's teapot =

Analogy devised by Bertrand Russell

Russell's teapot is an analogy, formulated by the philosopher Bertrand Russell (1872–1970), to illustrate that the philosophic burden of proof lies upon a person making empirically unfalsifiable claims, as opposed to shifting the burden of disproof to others.

Russell specifically applied his analogy in the context of religion. He wrote that if he were to assert, without offering proof, that a teapot, too small to be seen by telescopes, orbits the Sun somewhere in space between the Earth and Mars, he could not expect anyone to believe him solely because his assertion could not be proven wrong.

The analogy has been criticised by philosophers Brian Garvey, Peter van Inwagen and Alvin Plantinga, all with varying degrees of religious enthusiasm, as to its validity regarding religion. Russell's teapot has given rise to similar analogies as well as being used in parodies of religion.

== Description ==
In an article titled "Is There a God?", written in 1952, but not published until after his death, Russell wrote:

Many orthodox people speak as though it were the business of sceptics to disprove received dogmas rather than of dogmatists to prove them. This is, of course, a mistake. If I were to suggest that between the Earth and Mars there is a china teapot revolving about the sun in an elliptical orbit, nobody would be able to disprove my assertion provided I were careful to add that the teapot is too small to be revealed even by our most powerful telescopes. But if I were to go on to say that, since my assertion cannot be disproved, it is intolerable presumption on the part of human reason to doubt it, I should rightly be thought to be talking nonsense. If, however, the existence of such a teapot were affirmed in ancient books, taught as the sacred truth every Sunday, and instilled into the minds of children at school, hesitation to believe in its existence would become a mark of eccentricity and entitle the doubter to the attentions of the psychiatrist in an enlightened age or of the Inquisitor in an earlier time.

In 1958, Russell elaborated on the analogy:

I ought to call myself an agnostic; but, for all practical purposes, I am an atheist. I do not think the existence of the Christian God any more probable than the existence of the Gods of Olympus or Valhalla. To take another illustration: nobody can prove that there is not between the Earth and Mars a china teapot revolving in an elliptical orbit, but nobody thinks this sufficiently likely to be taken into account in practice. I think the Christian God just as unlikely.

== Analysis ==
Chemist Peter Atkins said that the point of Russell's teapot is that there is no burden on anyone to disprove assertions. Occam's razor has been interpreted to mean that the simpler theory with fewer assertions (i.e., a universe with no supernatural beings) should be the starting point in the discussion rather than the more complex theory. Responding to the invocation of Russell's "Celestial Teapot" by biologist Richard Dawkins as evidence against religion, an apologia by philosopher Paul Chamberlain contends that such arguments rely on an undue distinction between positive and negative claims. Chamberlain says it is logically erroneous to assert that positive truth claims bear a burden of proof while negative truth claims do not; he says "every truth claim, whether positive or negative, has a burden of proof."

In his books A Devil's Chaplain (2003) and The God Delusion (2006), Dawkins used the teapot as an analogy of an argument against what he termed "agnostic conciliation", a policy of intellectual appeasement that allows for philosophical domains that concern exclusively religious matters. Science has no way of establishing the existence or non-existence of a god. Therefore, according to the agnostic conciliator, because it is a matter of individual taste, belief and disbelief in a supreme being are deserving of equal respect and attention. Dawkins presents the teapot as a reductio ad absurdum of this position: if agnosticism demands giving equal respect to the belief and disbelief in a supreme being, then it must also give equal respect to belief in an orbiting teapot, since the existence of an orbiting teapot is just as plausible scientifically as the existence of a supreme being.

=== Criticism ===
Philosopher Brian Garvey argues that the teapot analogy fails with regard to religion because, with the teapot, the believer and non-believer are simply disagreeing about one item in the universe and may hold in common all other beliefs about the universe, which is not true of an atheist and a theist. Garvey argues that it is not a matter of the theist propounding existence of a thing and the atheist simply denying it – each is asserting an alternative explanation of why the cosmos exists and is the way it is. In the words of Garvey, "the atheist is not just denying an existence that the theist affirms – the atheist is in addition committed to the view that the universe is not the way it is because of God. It is either the way it is because of something other than God, or there is no reason it is the way it is."

Philosopher Peter van Inwagen argues that while Russell's teapot is a fine piece of rhetoric, its logical argument form is less than clear, and attempting to make it clear reveals that the teapot argument is very far from cogent. Another philosopher, Alvin Plantinga, states that a falsehood lies at the heart of Russell's argument. Russell's argument assumes that there is no evidence against the teapot, but Plantinga disagrees:

Clearly we have a great deal of evidence against teapotism. For example, as far as we know, the only way a teapot could have gotten into orbit around the sun would be if some country with sufficiently developed space-shot capabilities had shot this pot into orbit. No country with such capabilities is sufficiently frivolous to waste its resources by trying to send a teapot into orbit. Furthermore, if some country had done so, it would have been all over the news; we would certainly have heard about it. But we haven't. And so on. There is plenty of evidence against teapotism.

The literary critic James Wood, without himself believing in God, says that belief in God "is a good deal more reasonable than belief in a teapot" because God is a "grand and big idea" which "is not analogically disproved by reference to celestial teapots or vacuum cleaners, which lack the necessary bigness and grandeur" and "because God cannot be reified, cannot be turned into a mere thing".

One counter-argument, advanced by philosopher Eric Reitan, is that belief in God is different from belief in a teapot, because teapots are physical and therefore in principle verifiable, and that given what we know about the physical world, we have no good reason to think that belief in Russell's teapot is justified and at least some reason to think it not.

== Similar analogies ==
Other thinkers have posited non-disprovable analogies, such as J. B. Bury in his 1913 book, History of Freedom of Thought. He wrote:

Some people speak as if we were not justified in rejecting a theological doctrine unless we can prove it false. But the burden of proof does not lie upon the rejecter.... If you were told that in a certain planet revolving around Sirius there is a race of donkeys who speak the English language and spend their time in discussing eugenics, you could not disprove the statement, but would it, on that account, have any claim to be believed? Some minds would be prepared to accept it, if it were reiterated often enough, through the potent force of suggestion.

Astronomer Carl Sagan in his 1995 book The Demon-Haunted World offered a similar non-disprovable analogy called the Dragon in the Garage as an example of sceptical thinking. If Sagan claimed there was a dragon in his garage, one would wish to verify it for oneself but if Sagan's dragon was impossible to detect, he said:

Now, what's the difference between an invisible, incorporeal, floating dragon who spits heatless fire and no dragon at all? If there's no way to disprove my contention, no conceivable experiment that would count against it, what does it mean to say that my dragon exists?

== Influence in parodies of religion ==
Russell's teapot modelled on the Ichthys

The concept of Russell's teapot has influenced more explicitly religion-parodying concepts, such as the Invisible Pink Unicorn, as well as the Flying Spaghetti Monster. 1960s musician and psychedelic poet Daevid Allen of the band Gong employed the image of a flying teapot in his Planet Gong Universe and the Flying Teapot album trilogy, and refers to Russell's teapot in his book Gong Dreaming 2: The Histories & Mysteries of Gong from 1969–1975.

== See also ==
- Ad hoc hypothesis – Addition to a theory to prevent falsification
- Argument from ignorance – Informal fallacy
- Extraordinary claims require extraordinary evidence – Evidentiary standard for extraordinary claims
- Flying Spaghetti Monster – Satirical deity
- Invisible Pink Unicorn – Satirical goddess of a parody religion
- Knightian uncertainty – Lack of quantifiable knowledge in economics
- Hitchens's razor – Heuristic for rejecting claims made without evidence
