= Extraordinary claims require extraordinary evidence =

Evidentiary standard for extraordinary claims

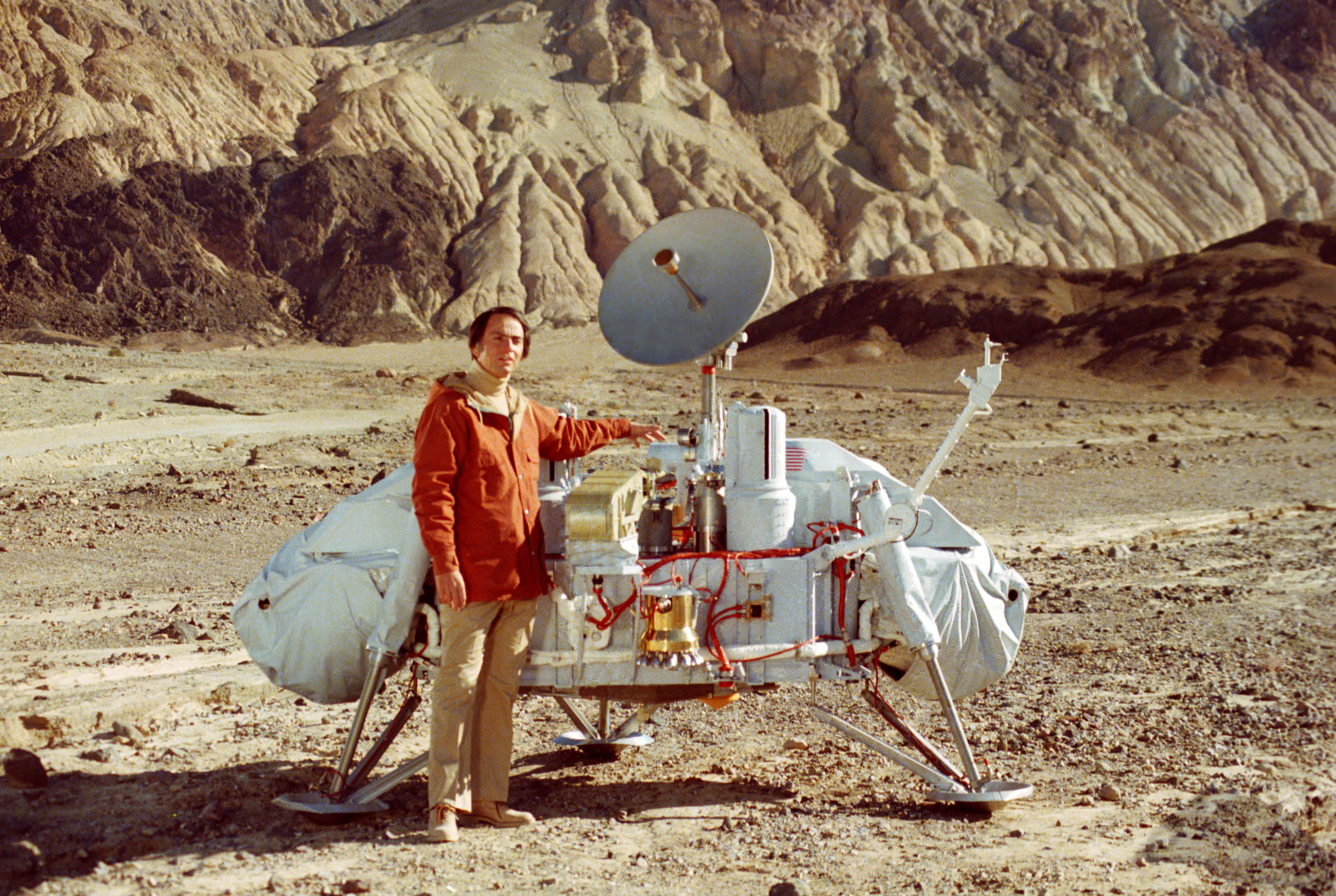
Carl Sagan, seen here with a model of Viking lander, popularized the aphorism.

"Extraordinary claims require extraordinary evidence" (sometimes shortened to ECREE), also known as the Sagan standard, is an aphorism popularized by science communicator Carl Sagan. He used the phrase in his 1979 book Broca's Brain and the 1980 television program Cosmos. It has been described as fundamental to the scientific method and is regarded as encapsulating the basic principles of scientific skepticism.

The concept is similar to Occam's razor in that both heuristics prefer simpler explanations of a phenomenon to more complicated ones. In application, there is some ambiguity regarding when evidence is deemed sufficiently "extraordinary". It is often invoked to challenge data and scientific findings, or to criticize pseudoscientific claims. Some critics have argued that the standard can suppress innovation and affirm confirmation biases.

Philosopher David Hume characterized the principle in his 1748 essay "Of Miracles". Similar statements were made by figures such as Thomas Jefferson in 1808, Pierre-Simon Laplace in 1814, and Théodore Flournoy in 1899. The formulation "extraordinary claims require extraordinary proof" was used a year prior to Sagan, by scientific skeptic Marcello Truzzi.

== Application ==
An interesting debate has gone on within the [Federal Communications Commission] between those who think that all doctrines that smell of pseudoscience should be combated and those who believe that each issue should be judged on its own merits, but that the burden of proof should fall squarely on those who make the proposals. I find myself very much in the latter camp. I believe that the extraordinary should certainly be pursued. But extraordinary claims require extraordinary evidence.

— Carl Sagan in his 1979 book Broca's Brain

The aphorism "extraordinary claims require extraordinary evidence", according to psychologist Patrizio Tressoldi, "is at the heart of the scientific method, and a model for critical thinking, rational thought and skepticism everywhere". It has also been described as a "fundamental principle of scientific skepticism". The phrase is often used in the context of paranormal and other pseudoscientific claims. It is also frequently invoked in scientific literature to challenge research proposals, like a new species of Amazonian tapir, biparental inheritance of mitochondrial DNA, or a Holocene "mega-tsunami".

The concept is related to Occam's razor as, according to such a heuristic, simpler explanations are preferred to more complicated ones. Only in situations where extraordinary evidence exists would an extraordinary claim be the simplest explanation. It appears in hypothesis testing, where the hypothesis that there is no evidence for the proposed phenomenon, what is known as the "null hypothesis", is preferred. The formal argument involves assigning a stronger Bayesian prior to the acceptance of the null hypothesis as opposed to its rejection.

== Origin and precursors ==
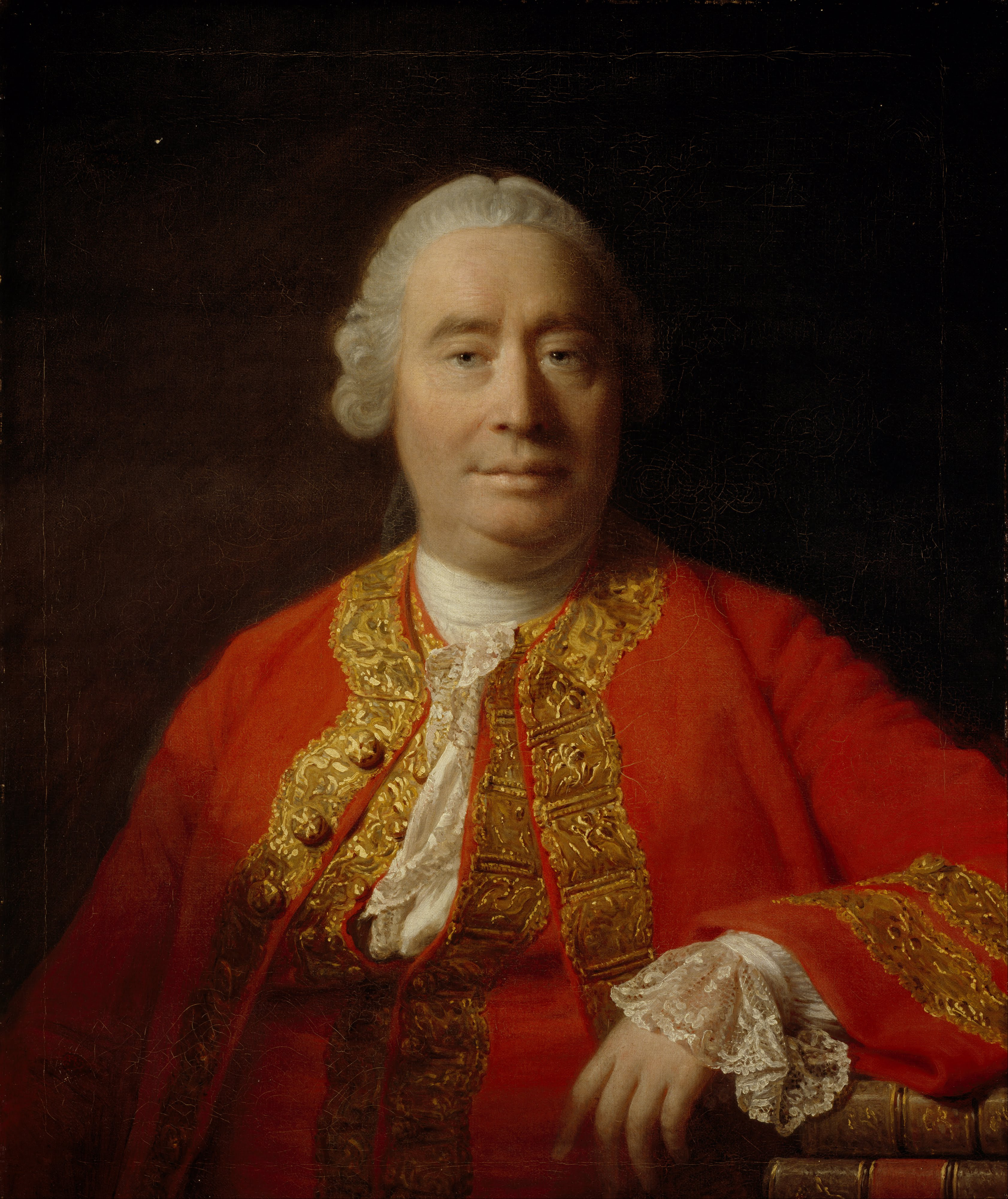
Philosopher David Hume may have been the first to fully describe the principles of the Sagan standard.

Science communicator Carl Sagan popularized the aphorism in his 1979 book Broca's Brain, and in his 1980 television show Cosmos in reference to claims about extraterrestrials visiting Earth. Sagan had first stated the eponymous standard in a 1977 interview with The Washington Post. However, scientific skeptic Marcello Truzzi used the formulation "extraordinary claims require extraordinary proof" in an article published by Parapsychology Review in 1975, as well as in a Zetetic Scholar article in 1978. Two 1978 articles quoted physicist Philip Abelson—then the editor of the journal Science—using the same phrasing as Truzzi.

In his 1748 essay "Of Miracles", philosopher David Hume wrote that if "the fact ... partakes of the extraordinary and the marvellous ... the evidence ... received a diminution, greater or less, in proportion as the fact is more or less unusual". Deming concluded that this was the first complete elucidation of the standard. Unlike Sagan, Hume defined the nature of "extraordinary": he wrote that it was a large magnitude of evidence.

Others had also put forward very similar ideas. Quote Investigator cites similar statements from Benjamin Bayly (in 1708), Arthur Ashley Sykes (1740), Beilby Porteus (1800), Elihu Palmer (1804), and William Craig Brownlee (1824). The French scholar Pierre-Simon Laplace, in essays (1810 and 1814) on the stability of the Solar System, wrote that "the weight of evidence for an extraordinary claim must be proportioned to its strangeness". Thomas Jefferson in an 1808 letter expressed contemporary skepticism of meteorites thus: "A thousand phenomena present themselves daily which we cannot explain, but where facts are suggested, bearing no analogy with the laws of nature as yet known to us, their verity needs proofs proportioned to their difficulty."

== Analysis and criticism ==
Sagan did not describe any concrete or quantitative parameters as to what constitutes "extraordinary evidence", which raises the issue of whether the standard can be applied objectively. Academic and climate change denialist David Deming notes that it would be "impossible to base all rational thought and scientific methodology on an aphorism whose meaning is entirely subjective". He instead argues that "extraordinary evidence" should be regarded as a sufficient amount of evidence rather than evidence deemed of extraordinary quality. Tressoldi noted that the threshold of evidence is typically decided through consensus. This problem is less apparent in clinical medicine and psychology, where statistical results can establish the strength of evidence.

Deming also noted that the standard can "suppress innovation and maintain orthodoxy". Others, like Etzel Cardeña, have noted that many scientific discoveries that spurred paradigm shifts were initially deemed "extraordinary" and likely would not have been so widely accepted if extraordinary evidence were required. Uniform rejection of extraordinary claims could affirm confirmation biases in subfields. Additionally, there are concerns that, when inconsistently applied, the standard exacerbates racial and gender biases. Psychologist Richard Shiffrin has argued that the standard should not be used to bar research from publication but to ascertain what is the best explanation for a phenomenon. Conversely, mathematical psychologist Eric-Jan Wagenmakers stated that extraordinary claims are often false and their publication "pollutes the literature". To qualify the publication of such claims, psychologist Suyog Chandramouli has suggested the inclusion of peer reviewers' opinions on their plausibility or an attached curation of post-publication peer evaluations.

Cognitive scientist and AI researcher Ben Goertzel believes that the phrase is used as a "rhetorical meme" without critical thought. Philosopher Theodore Schick argued that "extraordinary claims do not require extraordinary evidence" if they provide the most adequate explanation. Moreover, theists and Christian apologists like William Lane Craig have argued that it is unfair to apply the standard to religious miracles, as other improbable claims are often accepted based on limited testimonial evidence, such as an individual claiming that they won the lottery.

== See also ==
- Epistemology
- Hitchens's razor
- Logical positivism
- Philosophical razor
- Theory of justification
- Hanlon's razor
