= Ad hoc hypothesis =

Addition to a theory to prevent falsification

In science and philosophy, an ad hoc hypothesis is a hypothesis added to a theory in order to save it from being falsified.

For example, a person that wants to believe in leprechauns can avoid ever being proven wrong by using ad hoc hypotheses (e.g., by adding "they are invisible", then "their motives are complex", and so on).

Often, ad hoc hypothesizing is employed to compensate for anomalies not anticipated by the theory in its unmodified form.

== In the scientific community ==
Scientists are often skeptical of theories that rely on frequent, unsupported adjustments to sustain them. This is because, if a theorist so chooses, there is no limit to the number of ad hoc hypotheses that they could add. Thus the theory becomes more and more complex, but is never falsified. This is often at a cost to the theory's predictive power, however. Ad hoc hypotheses are often characteristic of pseudoscientific subjects.

Albert Einstein's addition of the cosmological constant to general relativity in order to allow a static universe was ad hoc. Although he later referred to it as his "greatest blunder", it may correspond to theories of dark energy.

== See also ==
- Ad hoc
- Fringe science
- Russell's teapot
- Deferent and epicycle § Bad science
- No true Scotsman
- Special pleading
- The Structure of Scientific Revolutions
- Proofs and Refutations
- "The Dragon in My Garage"
- Paraconsistent logic
- Moving the goalposts
