= Explanatory power =

Ability of a theory to explain a subject

Explanatory power is the ability of a hypothesis or theory to explain the subject matter effectively to which it pertains. Its opposite is explanatory impotence. Various criteria or measures for explanatory power have been proposed. In particular, one hypothesis, theory, or explanation can be said to have more explanatory power than another about the same subject matter, if:

- more facts or observations are accounted for;
- the theory changes more "surprising facts" into "a matter of course" (following Peirce);
- more details of causal relations are provided, leading to a high accuracy and precision of the description;
- it offers greater predictive power (if it offers more details about what should be expected to be seen and not seen);
- it depends less on authorities and more on observations;
- it makes fewer assumptions;
- it is more falsifiable (more testable by observation or experiment, according to the philosopher Karl Popper).
- it can be used to compress encoded observations into fewer bits (Solomonoff's theory of inductive inference)

David Deutsch proposed that theorists should seek explanations that are hard to vary. A theory or explanation is hard to vary if all details play a functional role, i.e., cannot be varied or removed without changing the predictions of the theory. Easy to vary (i.e., bad) explanations, in contrast, can be varied to be reconciled with new observations because they are barely connected to the details of the phenomenon of question.

== Examples ==
Deutsch takes examples from Greek mythology. He describes how very specific, and even somewhat falsifiable theories were provided to explain how the goddess Demeter's sadness caused the seasons. Alternatively, Deutsch points out, one could have just as easily explained the seasons as resulting from the god's happiness, which would make it a poor explanation because it is so easy to arbitrarily change details. Without Deutsch's criterion, the 'Greek gods explanation' could have just kept adding justifications. The same criterion, of being "hard to vary", may be what makes the modern explanation for the seasons a good one. None of the details about the Earth rotating around the Sun at a certain angle in a certain orbit can be easily modified without changing the theory's coherence.

== Relation to other criteria ==
Popper acknowledged that it is logically possible to avoid falsification of a hypothesis by changing details to avoid any criticism, adopting the term an immunizing stratagem from Hans Albert. Popper argued that scientific hypotheses should be subjected to methodological testing to select for the strongest hypothesis.

== See also ==
- Falsifiability
- Razor (philosophy)
- Critical rationalism
