= Evidence of absence =

Relevance fallacy

Evidence of absence is evidence of any kind that suggests something is missing or that it does not exist. What counts as evidence of absence has been a subject of debate between scientists and philosophers. It is often distinguished from absence of evidence.

== Overview ==
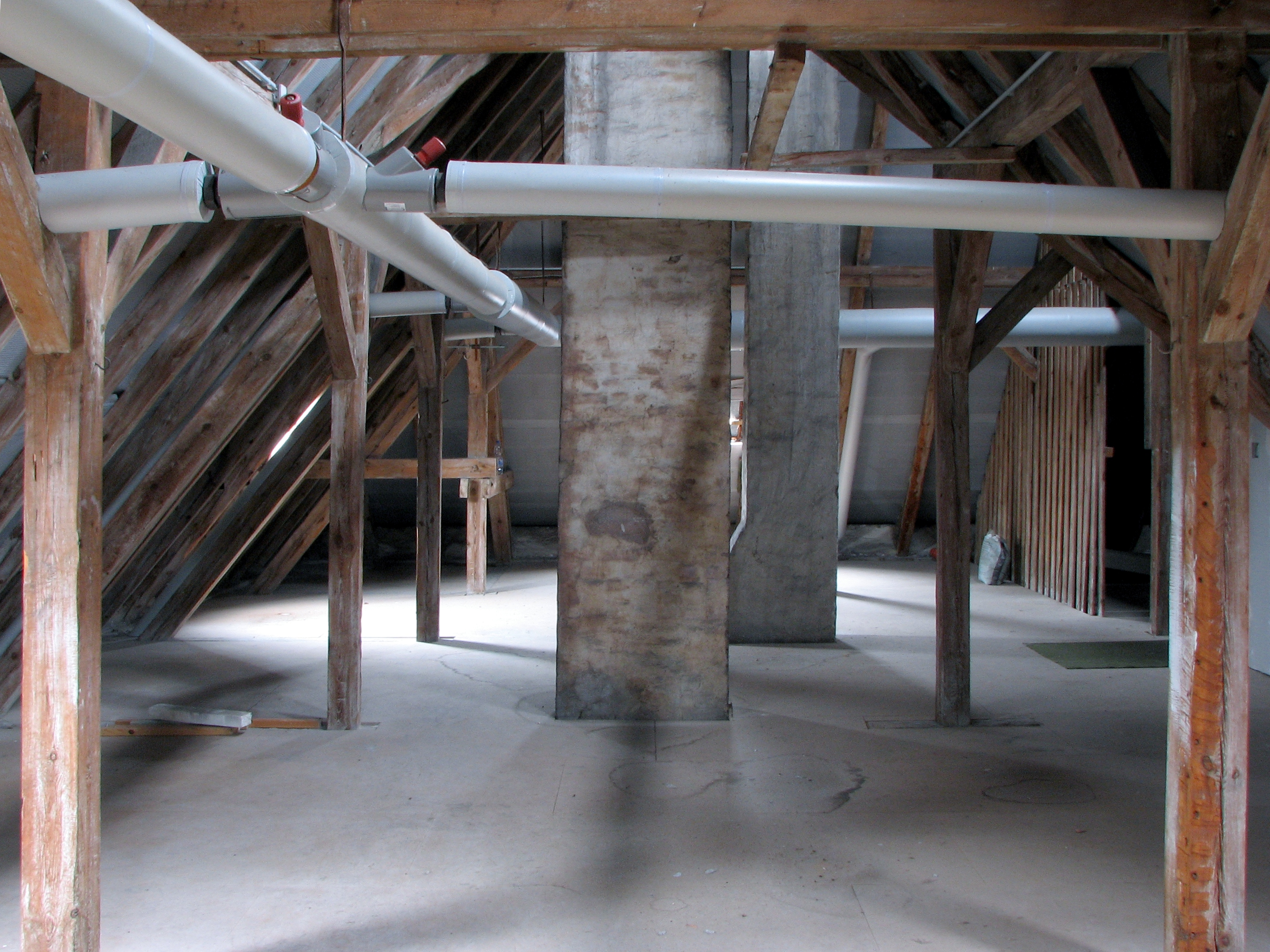
An exhaustive inspection of the attic for vermin can provide evidence of absence, but any sign of mice will always suffice to the contrary.

Evidence of absence and absence of evidence are similar but distinct concepts. This distinction is captured in the aphorism "Absence of evidence is not evidence of absence." This antimetabole is often attributed to Martin Rees or Carl Sagan, but a version appeared as early as 1888 in a writing by William Wright. In Sagan's words, the expression is a critique of the "impatience with ambiguity" exhibited by appeals to ignorance. Despite what the expression may seem to imply, a lack of evidence can be informative. For example, when testing a new drug, if no harmful effects are observed then this suggests that the drug is safe. This is because, if the drug were harmful, evidence of that fact can be expected to turn up during testing. The expectation of evidence makes its absence significant.

As the previous example shows, the difference between evidence that something is absent (e.g., an observation that suggests there were no dragons here today) and simple absence of evidence (e.g., no careful research has been done) can be nuanced. Indeed, scientists will often debate whether an experiment's result should be considered evidence of absence, or if it remains absence of evidence. The debate regards whether the experiment would have detected the phenomenon of interest if it were there.

The argument from ignorance for "absence of evidence" is not necessarily fallacious, for example, that a potentially life-saving new drug poses no long-term health risk unless proved otherwise. On the other hand, were such an argument to rely imprudently on the lack of research to promote its conclusion, it would be considered an informal fallacy whereas the former can be a persuasive way to shift the burden of proof in an argument or debate.

== Science ==
In carefully designed scientific experiments, null results can be interpreted as evidence of absence. Whether the scientific community will accept a null result as evidence of absence depends on many factors, including the detection power of the applied methods, the confidence of the inference, as well as confirmation bias within the community. For instance in amnesia studies, the absence of behavior indicative of memory is sometimes interpreted as the absence of the memory trace; however, certain researchers consider this interpretation flawed as the memory impairment may be temporary due to deficits in recall. Alternatively, the memory trace be latent and demonstrable via its indirect effects on new learning. Michael Davis, researcher at Emory University, argues that complete erasure can only be confidently inferred if all of the biological events that occurred when the memory was formed revert to their original status. Davis contends that because making these measurements in a complex organism is implausible, the concept of complete memory erasure (what he deems "strong form of forgetting") is not useful scientifically.

== Law ==
In many legal systems, a lack of evidence for a defendant's guilt is sufficient for acquittal. This is because of the presumption of innocence and the belief that it is worse to convict an innocent person than to let a guilty one go free.

On the other hand, the absence of evidence in the defendant's favor (e.g. an alibi) can make their guilt seem more likely. A jury can be persuaded to convict because of "evidentiary lacunae", or a lack of evidence they expect to hear.

== Proving a negative ==
A negative claim is a colloquialism for an affirmative claim that asserts the non-existence or exclusion of something. Proofs of negative claims are common in mathematics. Such claims include Euclid's theorem that there is no largest prime number, and Arrow's impossibility theorem. There can be multiple claims within a debate, nevertheless, whoever makes a claim usually carries the burden of proof regardless of positive or negative content in the claim.

A negative claim may or may not exist as a counterpoint to a previous claim. A proof of impossibility or an evidence of absence argument are typical methods to fulfill the burden of proof for a negative claim.

Philosopher Steven Hales argues that typically one can logically be as confident with the negation of an affirmation. Hales says that if one's standards of certainty leads them to say "there is never 'proof' of non-existence", then they must also say that "there is never 'proof' of existence either". Hales argues that there are many cases where we may be able to prove something does not exist with as much certainty as proving something does exist. A similar position is taken by philosopher Stephen Law who highlights that rather than focusing on the existence of "proof", a better question would be whether there is any reasonable doubt for existence or non-existence.

== See also ==
- Argument from ignorance
- Argument from silence
- Contraposition
- Probatio diabolica
- Proof by exhaustion
