= Hanlon's razor =

Adage to assume stupidity over malice

Hanlon's razor is an adage or rule of thumb that states, "Never attribute to malice that which is adequately explained by stupidity." It is a philosophical razor that promotes a way of eliminating unlikely explanations for human behavior, purportedly named after the American writer Robert J. Hanlon, who submitted the statement to Murphy's Law Book Two: More Reasons Why Things Go Wrong! (1980).

== Origin ==
In a compilation of various jokes related to Murphy's law published in Arthur Bloch's Murphy's Law Book Two: More Reasons Why Things Go Wrong! (1980), the adage was titled "Hanlon's razor", without any indication of who "Hanlon" might be.

A statement similar to Hanlon's razor appears in Robert A. Heinlein's 1941 novella "Logic of Empire". The character Doc in the story describes the "devil theory" fallacy, explaining, "You have attributed conditions to villainy that simply result from stupidity." English science fiction author H. G. Wells used a similar phrase in a letter published in the March 1898 edition of The Critic, where he spoke of Fighters From Mars, an unauthorised adaptation of The War of the Worlds, with the phrase "...not so much downright wickedness as a terrible mistake."

Hanlon's razor became well known after its inclusion in the Jargon File, a glossary of computer programmer slang, in 1990. Later that year, the Jargon File editors declared its origin unknown and wrote that there was a similar epigram by William James. However, this was considered misleading and likely to have actually referred to William James Laidlay, as Laidlay was known to have written a similar statement. In 1996, the Jargon File entry on Hanlon's Razor noted the existence of Laidlay's statement in Heinlein's novella, with speculation that "Hanlon's razor" might be a corruption of "Heinlein's Razor". The link to Murphy's law was described in a pair of 2001 blog entries by Quentin Stafford-Fraser, citing emails from Joseph E. Bigler. In 2002, the Jargon File entry noted the same. The Jargon File now calls it a "Murphyism".

The name was inspired by Occam's razor.

== Variations ==
Grey's law, a humorous parallel to Arthur C. Clarke's 3rd law:

Any sufficiently advanced incompetence is indistinguishable from malice.

A variation appears in The Wheels of Chance (1896) by H. G. Wells:

There is very little deliberate wickedness in the world. The stupidity of our selfishness gives much the same results indeed, but in the ethical laboratory it shows a different nature.

A similar quote is also misattributed to Napoleon. Andrew Roberts, in his biography of Winston Churchill, quotes from Churchill's correspondence with King George VI in February 1943 regarding disagreements with Charles de Gaulle: "His insolence ... may be founded on stupidity rather than malice."

== See also ==
- Philosophical razor – Principle that allows one to eliminate unlikely explanations
- Principle of charity – Interpreting statements in the most rational way possible
