= Burden of proof (philosophy) =

Obligation on a party in a dispute to provide sufficient warrant for their position

The burden of proof (Latin: onus probandi, shortened from Onus probandi incumbit ei qui dicit, non ei qui negat – the burden of proof lies with the one who speaks, not the one who denies) is the obligation on a party in a dispute to provide sufficient warrant for its position.

== Holder of the burden ==
When two parties are in a discussion and one makes a claim that the other disputes, the one who makes the claim typically has a burden of proof to justify or substantiate that claim, especially when it challenges a perceived status quo. This is also stated in Hitchens's razor, which declares that "what may be asserted without evidence may be dismissed without evidence." Carl Sagan proposed a related criterion: "Extraordinary claims require extraordinary evidence".

While certain kinds of arguments, such as logical syllogisms, require mathematical or strictly logical proofs, the standard for evidence to meet the burden of proof is usually determined by context and community standards and conventions.

Philosophical debate can devolve into arguing about who has the burden of proof about a particular claim. This has been described as "burden tennis" or the "onus game".

== Shifting the burden of proof ==
One way in which one would attempt to shift the burden of proof is by committing an informal fallacy known as the argument from ignorance. It occurs when either a proposition is assumed to be true because it has not yet been proven false or a proposition is assumed to be false because it has not yet been proven true.

== Proving a negative ==
A negative claim is the opposite of an affirmative or positive claim. It asserts the non-existence or exclusion of something.

Logicians and philosophers of logic reject the notion that it is impossible to prove negative claims. Philosophers Steven D. Hale and Stephen Law state that the phrase "you cannot prove a negative" is itself a negative claim that would not be true if it could be proven true. Many negative claims can be rewritten into logically equivalent positive claims (for example, "No Jewish person was at the party" is logically equivalent to "Everyone at the party was a gentile"). In formal logic and mathematics, the negation of a proposition can be proven using procedures such as modus tollens and reductio ad absurdum. In empirical contexts (such as evaluating the existence or nonexistence of unicorns), inductive reasoning is often used for establishing the plausibility of a claim based on observed evidence. Though inductive reasoning may not provide absolute certainty about negative claims, this is only due to the nature of inductive reasoning; inductive reasoning provides proof from probability rather than certainty. Inductive reasoning also does not provide absolute certainty about positive claims.

A negative claim may or may not exist as a counterpoint to a previous claim. A proof of impossibility or an evidence of absence argument are typical methods to fulfill the burden of proof for a negative claim.

== Application ==
=== In public discourse ===
Burden of proof is an important concept in the public arena of ideas. Once participants in discourse establish common assumptions, the mechanism of burden of proof helps to ensure that all parties contribute productively, using relevant arguments.

=== In law ===
In a legal dispute, one party is initially presumed to be correct and gets the benefit of the doubt, while the other side bears the burden of proof. When a party bearing the burden of proof meets their burden, the burden of proof switches to the other side. Burdens may be of different kinds for each party, in different phases of litigation. The burden of production is a minimal burden to produce at least enough evidence for the trier of fact to consider a disputed claim. After litigants have met the burden of production and their claim is being considered by a trier of fact, they have the burden of persuasion, that enough evidence has been presented to persuade the trier of fact that their side is correct. There are different standards of persuasiveness ranging from a preponderance of the evidence, where there is just enough evidence to tip the balance, to proof beyond a reasonable doubt, as in United States criminal courts.

The burden of proof is usually on the person who brings a claim in a dispute. It is often associated with the Latin maxim semper necessitas probandi incumbit ei qui agit, a translation of which in this context is: "the necessity of proof always lies with the person who lays charges."

The party that does not carry the burden of proof carries the benefit of assumption of being correct, they are presumed to be correct, until the burden shifts after presentation of evidence by the party bringing the action. An example is in an American criminal case, where there is a presumption of innocence by the defendant. Fulfilling the burden of proof effectively captures the benefit of assumption, passing the burden of proof off to another party.

=== In statistics ===
In inferential statistics, the null hypothesis is a general statement or default position that there is no relationship between two measured phenomena, or no association among groups. Rejecting or disproving the null hypothesis—and thus concluding that there are grounds for believing that there is a relationship between two phenomena (e.g. that a potential treatment has a measurable effect)—is a central task in the modern practice of science; the field of statistics gives precise criteria for rejecting a null hypothesis.

The null hypothesis is generally assumed to be true until evidence indicates otherwise. In statistics, it is often denoted H_{0} (read "H-nought", "H-null", "H-oh", or "H-zero").

The concept of a null hypothesis is used differently in two approaches to statistical inference. In the significance testing approach of Ronald Fisher, a null hypothesis is rejected if the observed data are significantly unlikely to have occurred if the null hypothesis were true. In this case the null hypothesis is rejected and an alternative hypothesis is accepted in its place. If the data are consistent with the null hypothesis, then the null hypothesis is not rejected. In neither case is the null hypothesis or its alternative proven; the null hypothesis is tested with data and a decision is made based on how likely or unlikely the data are. This is analogous to the legal principle of presumption of innocence, in which a suspect or defendant is assumed to be innocent (null is not rejected) until proven guilty (null is rejected) beyond a reasonable doubt (to a statistically significant degree).

In the hypothesis testing approach of Jerzy Neyman and Egon Pearson, a null hypothesis is contrasted with an alternative hypothesis and the two hypotheses are distinguished on the basis of data, with certain error rates.

Proponents of each approach criticize the other approach. Nowadays, though, a hybrid approach is widely practiced and presented in textbooks. The hybrid is in turn criticized as incorrect and incoherent—for details, see Statistical hypothesis testing.

Statistical inference can be done without a null hypothesis, by specifying a statistical model corresponding to each candidate hypothesis and using model selection techniques to choose the most appropriate model. (The most common selection techniques are based on either Akaike information criterion or Bayes factor.)

== See also ==
- J. B. Bury § History as a science
- Burden of proof (law)
- Justificationism
- Burden of Production
- Russell's teapot
