= Theory =

Supposition or system of ideas intended to explain something

Image of a Question mark

A theory is, in general, a set of propositions or ideas about something, developed in a variety of ways through any sort of reasoning. This includes informal folk psychological theories of why someone behaves the way they do, scientific theories that attempt to explain some phenomenon, philosophical theories (for example of politics or the nature of reality), and a range of other uses. Not all theories are equal and they may, for example, be compared in terms of how well they explain a phenomenon and the strength of evidence for and against them.

When applied to intellectual or academic situations, it is considered a systematic and rational form of abstract thinking about a phenomenon, or the conclusions derived from such thinking. It involves contemplative and logical reasoning, often supported by processes such as observation, experimentation, and research. Theories can be scientific, falling within the realm of empirical and testable knowledge, or they may belong to non-scientific disciplines, such as art or philosophy. In some cases, theories may exist independently of any formal discipline.

In modern science, the term "theory" refers to scientific theories, a well-confirmed type of explanation of nature, made in a way consistent with the scientific method, and fulfilling the criteria required by modern science. Such theories are described in such a way that scientific tests should be able to provide empirical support for it, or empirical contradiction ("falsify") of it. Scientific theories are the most reliable, rigorous, and comprehensive form of scientific knowledge, in contrast to more common uses of the word "theory" that imply that something is unproven or speculative (which in formal terms is better characterized by the word hypothesis). Scientific theories are distinguished from hypotheses, which are individual empirically testable conjectures, and from scientific laws, which are descriptive accounts of the way nature behaves under certain conditions.

Theories guide the enterprise of finding facts rather than of reaching goals, and are neutral concerning alternatives among values. A theory can be a body of knowledge, which may or may not be associated with particular explanatory models. To theorize is to develop this body of knowledge.

The word theory or "in theory" is sometimes used outside of science to refer to something which the speaker did not experience or test before. In science, this same concept is referred to as a hypothesis, and the word "hypothetically" is used both inside and outside of science. In its usage outside of science, the word "theory" is very often contrasted to "practice" (from Greek praxis, πρᾶξις) a Greek term for doing, which is opposed to theory. A "classical example" of the distinction between "theoretical" and "practical" uses the discipline of medicine: medical theory involves trying to understand the causes and nature of health and sickness, while the practical side of medicine is trying to make people healthy. These two things are related but can be independent, because it is possible to research health and sickness without curing specific patients, and it is possible to cure a patient without knowing how the cure worked. (Note: See for example Hippocrates Praeceptiones, Part 1. Archived 12 September 2014 at the Wayback Machine)

== Ancient usage ==
The English word theory derives from a technical term in philosophy in Ancient Greek. As an everyday word, theoria, θεωρία, meant "looking at, viewing, beholding", but in more technical contexts it came to refer to contemplative or speculative understandings of natural things, such as those of natural philosophers, as opposed to more practical ways of knowing things, like that of skilled orators or artisans. (Note: The word theoria occurs in Greek philosophy, for example, that of Plato. It is a statement of how and why particular facts are related. It is related to words for θεωρός "spectator", θέα thea "a view" + ὁρᾶν horan "to see", literally "looking at a show". See for example dictionary entries at Perseus website.) English-speakers have used the word theory since at least the late 16th century. Modern uses of the word theory derive from the original definition, but have taken on new shades of meaning, still based on the idea of a theory as a thoughtful and rational explanation of the general nature of things.

Although it has more mundane meanings in Greek, the word θεωρία apparently developed special uses early in the recorded history of the Greek language. In the book From Religion to Philosophy, Francis Cornford suggests that the Orphics used the word theoria to mean "passionate sympathetic contemplation". Pythagoras changed the word to mean "the passionless contemplation of rational, unchanging truth" of mathematical knowledge, because he considered this intellectual pursuit the way to reach the highest plane of existence. Pythagoras emphasized subduing emotions and bodily desires to help the intellect function at the higher plane of theory. Thus, it was Pythagoras who gave the word theory the specific meaning that led to the classical and modern concept of a distinction between theory (as uninvolved, neutral thinking) and practice.

Aristotle's terminology, as already mentioned, contrasts theory with praxis or practice, and this contrast exists till today. For Aristotle, both practice and theory involve thinking, but the aims are different. Theoretical contemplation considers things humans do not move or change, such as nature, so it has no human aim apart from itself and the knowledge it helps create. On the other hand, praxis involves thinking, but always with an aim to desired actions, whereby humans cause change or movement themselves for their own ends. Any human movement that involves no conscious choice and thinking could not be an example of praxis or doing. (Note: The LSJ cites two passages of Aristotle as examples, both from the Metaphysics and involving the definition of natural science: 11.1064a17, "it is clear that natural science (φυσικὴν ἐπιστήμην) must be neither practical (πρακτικὴν) nor productive (ποιητικὴν), but speculative (θεωρητικὴν)" and 6.1025b25, "Thus if every intellectual activity [διάνοια] is either practical or productive or speculative (θεωρητική), physics (φυσικὴ) will be a speculative [θεωρητική] science." So Aristotle actually made a three way distinction between practical, theoretical and productive or technical—or between doing, contemplating or making. All three types involve thinking, but are distinguished by what causes the objects of thought to move or change.)

== Formality ==
Theories are analytical tools for understanding, explaining, and making predictions about a given subject matter. There are theories in many and varied fields of study, including the arts and sciences. A formal theory is syntactic in nature and is only meaningful when given a semantic component by applying it to some content (e.g., facts and relationships of the actual historical world as it is unfolding). Theories in various fields of study are often expressed in natural language, but can be constructed in such a way that their general form is identical to a theory as it is expressed in the formal language of mathematical logic. Theories may be expressed mathematically, symbolically, or in common language, but are generally expected to follow principles of rational thought or logic. In the social sciences, a new theory must explain the core relationships among units or process steps, exploring a current gap or unresolved debate in a field, extending its explanations into testable hypotheses and practical implications to benefit society.

Theory is constructed of a set of sentences that are thought to be true statements about the subject under consideration. However, the truth of any one of these statements is always relative to the whole theory. Therefore, the same statement may be true with respect to one theory, and not true with respect to another. This is, in ordinary language, where statements such as "He is a terrible person" cannot be judged as true or false without reference to some interpretation of who "He" is and for that matter what a "terrible person" is under the theory.

Sometimes two theories have exactly the same explanatory power because they make the same predictions. A pair of such theories is called indistinguishable or observationally equivalent, and the choice between them reduces to convenience or philosophical preference.

The form of theories is studied formally in mathematical logic, especially in model theory. When theories are studied in mathematics, they are usually expressed in some formal language and their statements are closed under application of certain procedures called rules of inference. A special case of this, an axiomatic theory, consists of axioms (or axiom schemata) and rules of inference. A theorem is a statement that can be derived from those axioms by application of these rules of inference. Theories used in applications are abstractions of observed phenomena and the resulting theorems provide solutions to real-world problems. Obvious examples include arithmetic (abstracting concepts of number), geometry (concepts of space), and probability (concepts of randomness and likelihood).

Gödel's incompleteness theorem shows that no consistent, recursively enumerable theory (that is, one whose theorems form a recursively enumerable set) in which the concept of natural numbers can be expressed, can include all true statements about them. As a result, some domains of knowledge cannot be formalized, accurately and completely, as mathematical theories. (Here, formalizing accurately and completely means that all true propositions—and only true propositions—are derivable within the mathematical system.) This limitation, however, in no way precludes the construction of mathematical theories that formalize large bodies of scientific knowledge.

=== Underdetermination ===
A theory is underdetermined (also called indeterminacy of data to theory) if a rival, inconsistent theory is at least as consistent with the evidence. Underdetermination is an epistemological issue about the relation of evidence to conclusions.

A theory that lacks supporting evidence is generally, more properly, referred to as a hypothesis.

=== Intertheoretic reduction and elimination ===
If a new theory better explains and predicts a phenomenon than an old theory (i.e., it has more explanatory power), we are justified in believing that the newer theory describes reality more correctly. This is called an intertheoretic reduction because the terms of the old theory can be reduced to the terms of the new one. For instance, our historical understanding about sound, light and heat have been reduced to wave compressions and rarefactions, electromagnetic waves, and molecular kinetic energy, respectively. These terms, which are identified with each other, are called intertheoretic identities. When an old and new theory are parallel in this way, we can conclude that the new one describes the same reality, only more completely.

When a new theory uses new terms that do not reduce to terms of an older theory, but rather replace them because they misrepresent reality, it is called an intertheoretic elimination. For instance, the obsolete scientific theory that put forward an understanding of heat transfer in terms of the movement of caloric fluid was eliminated when a theory of heat as energy replaced it. Also, the theory that phlogiston is a substance released from burning and rusting material was eliminated with the new understanding of the reactivity of oxygen.

=== Versus theorems ===
Theories are distinct from theorems. A theorem is derived deductively from axioms (basic assumptions) according to a formal system of rules, sometimes as an end in itself and sometimes as a first step toward being tested or applied in a concrete situation; theorems are said to be true in the sense that the conclusions of a theorem are logical consequences of the axioms. Theories are abstract and conceptual, and are supported or challenged by observations in the world. They are 'rigorously tentative', meaning that they are proposed as true and expected to satisfy careful examination to account for the possibility of faulty inference or incorrect observation. Sometimes theories are incorrect, meaning that an explicit set of observations contradicts some fundamental objection or application of the theory, but more often theories are corrected to conform to new observations, by restricting the class of phenomena the theory applies to or changing the assertions made. An example of the former is the restriction of classical mechanics to phenomena involving macroscopic length scales and particle speeds much lower than the speed of light.

== Theory–practice relationship ==
Theory is often distinguished from practice or praxis. The question of whether theoretical models of work are relevant to work itself is of interest to scholars of professions such as medicine, engineering, law, and management.

The gap between theory and practice has been framed as a knowledge transfer where there is a task of translating research knowledge to be application in practice, and ensuring that practitioners are made aware of it. Academics have been criticized for not attempting to transfer the knowledge they produce to practitioners. Another framing supposes that theory and knowledge seek to understand different problems and model the world in different words (using different ontologies and epistemologies). Another framing says that research does not produce theory that is relevant to practice.

In the context of management, Van de Van and Johnson propose a form of engaged scholarship where scholars examine problems that occur in practice, in an interdisciplinary fashion, producing results that create both new practical results as well as new theoretical models, but targeting theoretical results shared in an academic fashion. They use a metaphor of "arbitrage" of ideas between disciplines, distinguishing it from collaboration.

== Scientific ==
In science, the term "theory" refers to "a well-substantiated explanation of some aspect of the natural world, based on a body of facts that have been repeatedly confirmed through observation and experiment." Theories must also meet further requirements, such as the ability to make falsifiable predictions with consistent accuracy across a broad area of scientific inquiry, and production of strong evidence in favor of the theory from multiple independent sources (consilience).

The strength of a scientific theory is related to the diversity of phenomena it can explain, which is measured by its ability to make falsifiable predictions with respect to those phenomena. Theories are improved (or replaced by better theories) as more evidence is gathered, so that accuracy in prediction improves over time; this increased accuracy corresponds to an increase in scientific knowledge. Scientists use theories as a foundation to gain further scientific knowledge, as well as to accomplish goals such as inventing technology or curing diseases.

=== Definitions from scientific organizations ===
The United States National Academy of Sciences defines scientific theories as follows:

The formal scientific definition of "theory" is quite different from the everyday meaning of the word. It refers to a comprehensive explanation of some aspect of nature that is supported by a vast body of evidence. Many scientific theories are so well established that no new evidence is likely to alter them substantially. For example, no new evidence will demonstrate that the Earth does not orbit around the sun (heliocentric theory), or that living things are not made of cells (cell theory), that matter is not composed of atoms, or that the surface of the Earth is not divided into solid plates that have moved over geological timescales (the theory of plate tectonics) ... One of the most useful properties of scientific theories is that they can be used to make predictions about natural events or phenomena that have not yet been observed.

From the American Association for the Advancement of Science:

A scientific theory is a well-substantiated explanation of some aspect of the natural world, based on a body of facts that have been repeatedly confirmed through observation and experiment. Such fact-supported theories are not "guesses" but reliable accounts of the real world. The theory of biological evolution is more than "just a theory." It is as factual an explanation of the universe as the atomic theory of matter or the germ theory of disease. Our understanding of gravity is still a work in progress. But the phenomenon of gravity, like evolution, is an accepted fact.

The term theory is not appropriate for describing scientific models or untested, but intricate hypotheses.

=== Philosophical views ===
The logical positivists thought of scientific theories as deductive theories—that a theory's content is based on some formal system of logic and on basic axioms. In a deductive theory, any sentence which is a logical consequence of one or more of the axioms is also a sentence of that theory. This is called the received view of theories.

In the semantic view of theories, which has largely replaced the received view, theories are viewed as scientific models. A model is an abstract and informative representation of reality (a "model of reality"), similar to the way that a map is a graphical model that represents the territory of a city or country. In this approach, theories are a specific category of models that fulfill the necessary criteria. (See Theories as models for further discussion.)

=== In physics ===
In physics the term theory is generally used for a mathematical framework—derived from a small set of basic postulates (usually symmetries, like equality of locations in space or in time, or identity of electrons, etc.)—which is capable of producing experimental predictions for a given category of physical systems. One good example is classical electromagnetism, which encompasses results derived from gauge symmetry (sometimes called gauge invariance) in a form of a few equations called Maxwell's equations. The specific mathematical aspects of classical electromagnetic theory are termed "laws of electromagnetism", reflecting the level of consistent and reproducible evidence that supports them. Within electromagnetic theory generally, there are numerous hypotheses about how electromagnetism applies to specific situations. Many of these hypotheses are already considered adequately tested, with new ones always in the making and perhaps untested.

=== Regarding the term "theoretical" ===
Certain tests may be infeasible or technically difficult. As a result, theories may make predictions that have not been confirmed or proven incorrect. These predictions may be described informally as "theoretical". They can be tested later, and if they are incorrect, this may lead to revision, invalidation, or rejection of the theory.

== Mathematical ==
In mathematics, the term theory is used differently than its use in science – necessarily so, since mathematics contains no explanations of natural phenomena per se, even though it may help provide insight into natural systems or be inspired by them. In the general sense, a mathematical theory is a branch of mathematics devoted to some specific topics or methods, such as set theory, number theory, group theory, probability theory, game theory, control theory, perturbation theory, etc., such as might be appropriate for a single textbook.

In mathematical logic, a theory has a related but different sense: it is the collection of the theorems that can be deduced from a given set of axioms and a given set of inference rules.

== Philosophical ==
A theory can be either descriptive as in science, or prescriptive (normative) as in philosophy. The latter are those whose subject matter consists not of empirical data, but rather of ideas. At least some of the elementary theorems of a philosophical theory are statements whose truth cannot necessarily be scientifically tested through empirical observation.

A field of study is sometimes named a "theory" because its basis is some initial set of assumptions describing the field's approach to the subject. These assumptions are the elementary theorems of the particular theory, and can be thought of as the axioms of that field. Some commonly known examples include set theory and number theory; however literary theory, critical theory, and music theory are also of the same form.

=== Metatheory ===
One form of philosophical theory is a metatheory or meta-theory. A metatheory is a theory whose subject matter is some other theory or set of theories. In other words, it is a theory about theories. Statements made in the metatheory about the theory are called metatheorems.

== Political ==
A political theory is an ethical theory about the law and government. Often the term "political theory" refers to a general view, or specific ethic, political belief or attitude, thought about politics.

== Jurisprudential ==
In social science, jurisprudence is the philosophical theory of law. Contemporary philosophy of law addresses problems internal to law and legal systems, and problems of law as a particular social institution.

== Examples ==
Most of the following are scientific theories. Some are not, but rather encompass a body of knowledge or art, such as Music theory and Visual Arts Theories.

- Anthropology:
  - Carneiro's circumscription theory
- Astronomy:
  - Alpher–Bethe–Gamow theory —
  - B^{2}FH Theory —
  - Copernican theory —
  - Newton's theory of gravitation —
  - Hubble's law —
  - Kepler's laws of planetary motion Ptolemaic theory
- Biology:
  - Cell theory —
  - Chemiosmotic theory —
  - Evolution —
  - Germ theory —
  - Symbiogenesis
- Chemistry:
  - Molecular theory —
  - Kinetic theory of gases —
  - Molecular orbital theory —
  - Valence bond theory —
  - Transition state theory —
  - RRKM theory —
  - Chemical graph theory —
  - Flory–Huggins solution theory —
  - Marcus theory —
  - Lewis theory (successor to Brønsted–Lowry acid–base theory) —
  - HSAB theory —
  - Debye–Hückel theory —
  - Thermodynamic theory of polymer elasticity —
  - Reptation theory —
  - Polymer field theory —
  - Møller–Plesset perturbation theory —
  - density functional theory —
  - Frontier molecular orbital theory —
  - Polyhedral skeletal electron pair theory —
  - Baeyer strain theory —
  - Quantum theory of atoms in molecules —
  - Collision theory —
  - Ligand field theory (successor to Crystal field theory) —
  - Variational transition-state theory —
  - Benson group increment theory —
  - Specific ion interaction theory
- Climatology:
  - Climate change theory (general study of climate changes)
  - anthropogenic climate change (ACC)/
  - anthropogenic global warming (AGW) theories (due to human activity)
- Computer Science:
  - Automata theory —
  - Queueing theory
- Cosmology:
  - Big Bang Theory —
  - Cosmic inflation —
  - Loop quantum gravity —
  - Superstring theory —
  - Supergravity —
  - Supersymmetric theory —
  - Multiverse theory —
  - Holographic principle —
  - Quantum gravity —
  - M-theory
- Economics:
  - Macroeconomic theory —
  - Microeconomic theory —
  - Law of Supply and demand
- Education:
  - Constructivist theory —
  - Critical pedagogy theory —
  - Education theory —
  - Multiple intelligence theory —
  - Progressive education theory
- Engineering:
  - Circuit theory —
  - Control theory —
  - Signal theory —
  - Systems theory —
  - Information theory
- Film:
  - Film theory
- Geology:
  - Plate tectonics
- Humanities:
  - Critical theory
- Jurisprudence or 'Legal theory':
  - Natural law —
  - Legal positivism —
  - Legal realism —
  - Critical legal studies
- Law: see Jurisprudence; also Case theory
- Linguistics:
  - X-bar theory —
  - Government and Binding —
  - Principles and parameters —
  - Universal grammar
- Literature:
  - Literary theory
- Mathematics:
  - Approximation theory —
  - Arakelov theory —
  - Asymptotic theory —
  - Bifurcation theory —
  - Catastrophe theory —
  - Category theory —
  - Chaos theory —
  - Choquet theory —
  - Coding theory —
  - Combinatorial game theory —
  - Computability theory —
  - Computational complexity theory —
  - Deformation theory —
  - Dimension theory —
  - Ergodic theory —
  - Field theory —
  - Galois theory —
  - Game theory —
  - Gauge theory —
  - Graph theory —
  - Group theory —
  - Hodge theory —
  - Homology theory —
  - Homotopy theory —
  - Ideal theory —
  - Intersection theory —
  - Invariant theory —
  - Iwasawa theory —
  - K-theory —
  - KK-theory —
  - Knot theory —
  - L-theory —
  - Lie theory —
  - Littlewood–Paley theory —
  - Matrix theory —
  - Measure theory —
  - Model theory —
  - Module theory —
  - Morse theory —
  - Nevanlinna theory —
  - Number theory —
  - Obstruction theory —
  - Operator theory —
  - Order theory —
  - PCF theory —
  - Perturbation theory —
  - Potential theory —
  - Probability theory —
  - Ramsey theory —
  - Rational choice theory —
  - Representation theory —
  - Ring theory —
  - Set theory —
  - Shape theory —
  - Small cancellation theory —
  - Spectral theory —
  - Stability theory —
  - Stable theory —
  - Sturm–Liouville theory —
  - Surgery theory —
  - Twistor theory —
  - Yang–Mills theory
- Music:
  - Music theory
- Philosophy:
  - Proof theory —
  - Speculative reason —
  - Theory of truth —
  - Type theory —
  - Value theory —
  - Virtue theory
- Physics:
  - Acoustic theory —
  - Antenna theory —
  - Atomic theory —
  - BCS theory —
  - Conformal field theory —
  - Dirac hole theory —
  - Dynamo theory —
  - Landau theory —
  - M-theory —
  - Perturbation theory —
  - Theory of relativity (successor to classical mechanics) —
  - Gauge theory —
  - Quantum field theory —
  - Scattering theory —
  - String theory —
  - Quantum information theory
- Psychology:
  - Cognitive dissonance theory —
  - Attachment theory —
  - Object permanence —
  - Poverty of stimulus —
  - Attribution theory —
  - Self-fulfilling prophecy —
  - Stockholm syndrome
- Public Budgeting:
  - Incrementalism —
  - Zero-based budgeting
- Public Administration:
  - Organizational theory
- Semiotics:
  - Intertheoricity –
  - Transferogenesis
- Sociology:
  - Critical theory —
  - Engaged theory —
  - Social theory —
  - Sociological theory –
  - Social capital theory
- Statistics:
  - Extreme value theory
- Theatre:
  - Performance theory
- Visual Arts:
  - Aesthetics —
  - Art educational theory —
  - Architecture —
  - Composition —
  - Anatomy —
  - Color theory —
  - Perspective —
  - Visual perception —
  - Geometry —
  - Manifolds
- Other:
  - Obsolete scientific theories

== See also ==
- Falsifiability
- Hypothesis testing
- Physical law
- Predictive power
- Testability
- Theoretical definition
- Lay theory
