= Success =

Meeting or surpassing an intended goal or objective

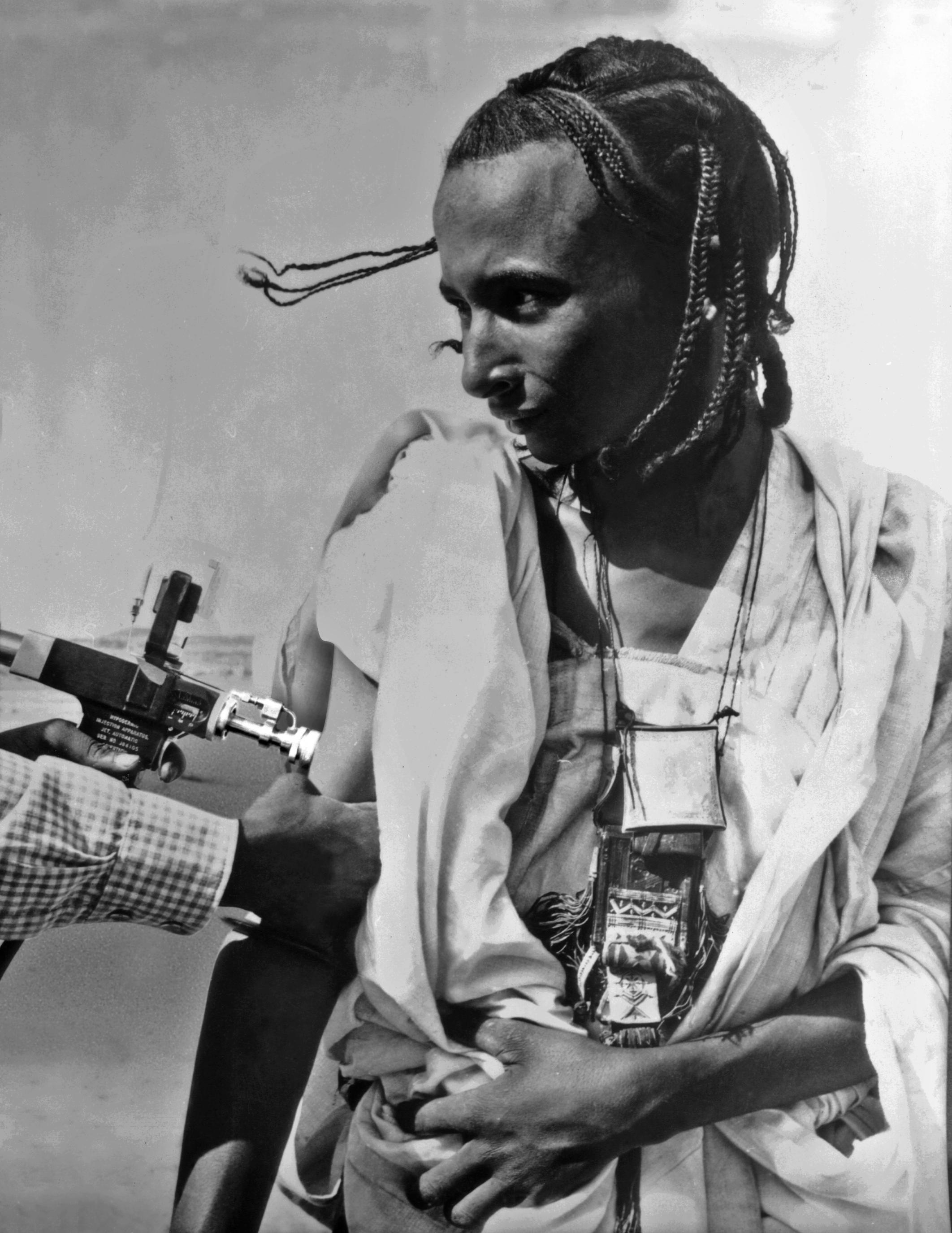
A Nigerian man receives the smallpox vaccine in February 1969, as part of a global program that successfully eradicated the disease from the human population.

Success is the state or condition of meeting a defined range of expectations. It may be viewed as the opposite of failure. The criteria for success depend on context, and may be relative to a particular observer or belief system. One person might consider a success what another person considers a failure, particularly in cases of direct competition or a zero-sum game. Similarly, the degree of success or failure in a situation may be differently viewed by distinct observers or participants, such that a situation that one considers to be a success, another might consider to be a failure, a qualified success or a neutral situation. For example, a film that is a commercial failure or even a box-office bomb can go on to receive a cult following, with the initial lack of commercial success even lending a cachet of subcultural coolness.

It may also be difficult or impossible to ascertain whether a situation meets the criteria for success or failure due to an ambiguous or ill-defined definition of those criteria. Finding useful and effective criteria, or heuristics, to judge the failure or success of a situation may itself be a significant task.

== In American culture ==
DeVitis and Rich link the success to the notion of the American Dream. They observe that "[t]he ideal of success is found in the American Dream which is probably the most potent ideology in American life" and suggest that "Americans generally believe in achievement, success, and materialism." Weiss, in his study of success in the American psyche, compares the American view of success with Max Weber's concept of the Protestant work ethic. A private opinion survey by the think tank Populace, found that Americans now emphasize secure retirement, financial independence, parenthood and work fulfillment as their American Dream.

== In biology ==
Natural selection is the variation in successful survival and reproduction of individuals due to differences in phenotype. It is a key mechanism of evolution, the change in the heritable traits characteristic of a population over generations. Charles Darwin popularized the term "natural selection", contrasting it with artificial selection, which in his view is intentional, whereas natural selection is not. As Darwin phrased it in 1859, natural selection is the "principle by which each slight variation [of a trait], if useful, is preserved". The concept was simple but powerful: individuals best adapted to their environments are more likely to survive and reproduce. As long as there is some variation between them and that variation is heritable, there will be an inevitable selection of individuals with the most advantageous variations. If the variations are heritable, then differential reproductive success leads to a progressive evolution of particular populations of a species, and populations that evolve to be sufficiently different eventually become different species.

== In education ==
A student's success within an educational system is often expressed by way of grading. Grades may be given as numbers, letters or other symbols. By the year 1884, Mount Holyoke College was evaluating students' performance on a 100-point or percentage scale and then summarizing those numerical grades by assigning letter grades to numerical ranges. Mount Holyoke assigned letter grades A through E, with E indicating lower than 75% performance. The A–E system spread to Harvard University by 1890. In 1898, Mount Holyoke adjusted the grading system, adding an F grade for failing (and adjusting the ranges corresponding to the other letters). The practice of letter grades spread more broadly in the first decades of the 20th century. By the 1930s, the letter E was dropped from the system, for unclear reasons.

Educational systems themselves can be evaluated on how successfully they impart knowledge and skills. For example, the Programme for International Student Assessment (PISA) is a worldwide study by the Organisation for Economic Co-operation and Development (OECD) intended to evaluate educational systems by measuring 15-year-old school pupils' scholastic performance on mathematics, science, and reading. It was first performed in 2000 and then repeated every three years.

Carol Dweck, a Stanford University psychologist, primarily researches motivation, personality, and development as related to implicit theories of intelligence, her key contribution to education the 2006 book Mindset: The New Psychology of Success. Dweck's work presents mindset as on a continuum between fixed mindset (intelligence is static) and growth mindset (intelligence can be developed). Growth mindset is a learning focus that embraces challenge and supports persistence in the face of setbacks. As a result of growth mindset, individuals have a greater sense of free will and are more likely to continue working toward their idea of success despite setbacks.

== In business and leadership ==
Malcolm Gladwell's 2008 book Outliers: The Story of Success suggests that the notion of the self-made man is a myth. Gladwell argues that the success of entrepreneurs such as Bill Gates is due to their circumstances, as opposed to their inborn talent.

Andrew Likierman, former Dean of London Business School, argues that success is a relative rather than an absolute term: success needs to be measured against stated objectives and against the achievements of relevant peers: he suggests Jeff Bezos (Amazon) and Jack Ma (Alibaba) have been successful in business "because at the time they started there were many companies aspiring to the dominance these two have achieved". Likierman puts forward four propositions regarding company success and its measurement:

1. There is no single definition of "a successful company" and no single measure of "company success"
2. Profit and share value cannot be taken directly as measures of company success and require careful interpretation
3. Judgement is required when interpreting past and present performance
4. "Company success" reflects an interpretation of key factors: it is not a "fact".

== In philosophy of science ==
Graph of cosmic microwave background spectrum measured by the FIRAS instrument on the COBE, the most precisely measured black body spectrum in nature. The error bars are too small to be seen even in an enlarged image, and it is impossible to distinguish the observed data from the theoretical curve.

Scientific theories are often deemed successful when they make predictions that are confirmed by experiment. For example, calculations regarding the Big Bang predicted the cosmic microwave background and the relative abundances of chemical elements in deep space (see Big Bang nucleosynthesis), and observations have borne out these predictions. Scientific theories can also achieve success more indirectly, by suggesting other ideas that turn out correct. For example, Johannes Kepler conceived a model of the Solar System based on the Platonic solids. Although this idea was itself incorrect, it motivated him to pursue the work that led to the discoveries now known as Kepler's laws, which were pivotal in the development of astronomy and physics.

== In probability ==
The fields of probability and statistics often study situations where events are labeled as "successes" or "failures". For example, a Bernoulli trial is a random experiment with exactly two possible outcomes, "success" and "failure", in which the probability of success is the same every time the experiment is conducted. The concept is named after Jacob Bernoulli, a 17th-century Swiss mathematician, who analyzed them in his Ars Conjectandi (1713). The term "success" in this sense consists in the result meeting specified conditions, not in any moral judgement. For example, the experiment could be the act of rolling a single die, with the result of rolling a six being declared a "success" and all other outcomes grouped together under the designation "failure". Assuming a fair die, the probability of success would then be $1/6$.

== Dissatisfaction with success ==
Although fame and success are widely sought by many people, successful people are often displeased by their status. Overall, there is a general correlation between success and unhappiness. A study done in 2008 notes that CEOs are depressed at more than double the rate of the public at large, suggesting that this is not a phenomenon exclusive to celebrities. Research suggests that people tend to focus more on objective success (ie: status, wealth, reputation) as benchmarks for success, rather than subjective success (ie: self-worth, relationships, moral introspection), and as a result become disillusioned with the success they do have. Celebrities in particular face specific circumstances that cause them to be displeased by their success.

== See also ==
- Critical success factor
- Customer success
- Probability of success
- Propaganda of success
- Success trap
- Survivorship bias
- Victory

== Sources ==
- Darwin, Charles (1859). On the Origin of Species by Means of Natural Selection, or the Preservation of Favoured Races in the Struggle for Life (1st ed.). London: John Murray. LCCN 06017473. OCLC 741260650.
- DeVitis, Joseph L; Rich, John Martin (1996). The Success Ethic, Education, and the American Dream. Albany, New York: State University of New York Press. ISBN 978-0-585-06057-6. OCLC 42855408.
- Weiss, Richard (1969). The American Myth of Success: From Horatio Alger to Norman Vincent Peale. University of Illinois Press. ISBN 978-0-252-06043-4.
