= Mentality (disambiguation) =

Mentality is a mindset, a way of thinking.

Mentality may also refer to:

- The property of having intelligence
- Mental capacity, a measure of one's intelligence, the sum of one's intellectual capabilities
