= Predictive power =

Ability of a scientific theory to generate testable predictions

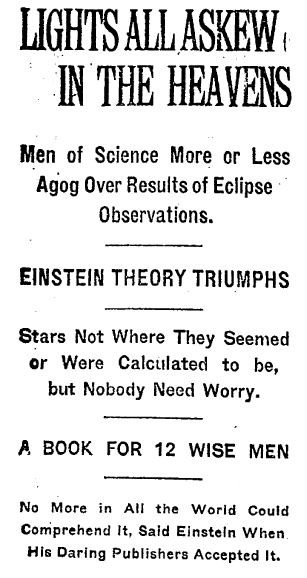
The New York Times of November 10, 1919, reported on Einstein's confirmed prediction of gravitation on space, called the gravitational lens effect.

The concept of predictive power, the power of a scientific theory to generate testable predictions, differs from explanatory power and descriptive power (where phenomena that are already known are retrospectively explained or described by a given theory) in that it allows a prospective test of theoretical understanding.

== Examples ==
A classic example of the predictive power of a theory is the discovery of Neptune as a result of predictions made by mathematicians John Couch Adams and Urbain Le Verrier, based on Newton's theory of gravity.

Another example of the predictive power of theories or models is Dmitri Mendeleev's use of his periodic table to predict previously undiscovered chemical elements and their properties. Though largely correct, he misjudged the relative atomic masses of tellurium and iodine.

Moreover, Charles Darwin used his knowledge of evolution by natural selection to predict that since a plant (Angraecum sesquipedale) with a long spur in its flowers exists, a complementary animal with a 30 cm proboscis must also exist to feed on and pollinate it. Twenty years after his death, a form of hawk moth (Xanthopan morganii) that did just that was found.

Another example of predictive power is the prediction of Einstein's theory of general relativity that the path of light would bend in the presence of a strong gravitational field. This was experimentally verified by an expedition to Sobral in Brazil and the Atlantic island of Príncipe to measure star positions during the solar eclipse of May 29, 1919, when observations made by the astrophysicist Arthur Eddington seemed to confirm Einstein's predictions. Although the measurements have been criticized by some as utilizing flawed methodology, modern reanalysis of the data suggests that Eddington's analysis of the data was accurate. Later, more precise measurements taken by radio interferometry confirmed the predictions to a high degree of accuracy.

== Applications ==
The predictive power of a theory is closely related to applications.

General relativity not only predicts the bending of light but also predicts several other phenomena. Recently, the calculation of proper time of satellites has been a successfully-measured prediction that is now incorporated into the method used to calculate positions via GPS.

If a theory has no predictive power, it cannot be used for applications.

== See also ==
- Accuracy paradox
- Forecast verification
- Inductive probability § Removing theories without predictive power
- Predictive probability of success § Relationship with conditional power and predictive power
- Probability of success
- Problem of induction
- Social identity theory § Predictive power
- Statistical model validation
