= Suppe =

Suppe or von Suppé is a surname. Notable people with the surname include:

- Franz von Suppé (1819–1895), Austrian composer
- Frederick Suppe (born 1940), American philosopher
- John Suppe (born 1942), American geologist

== See also ==
- Suppes
