= Phases of clinical research =

Clinical trial stages using human subjects

National Cancer Institute video on clinical trial phases

The phases of clinical research are the stages in which scientists conduct experiments with a health intervention to obtain sufficient evidence for a process considered effective as a medical treatment. For drug development, the clinical phases start with testing for drug safety in a few human subjects, then expand to many study participants (potentially tens of thousands) to determine if the treatment is effective. Clinical research is conducted on drug candidates, vaccine candidates, new medical devices, and new diagnostic assays.

== Description ==
Clinical trials testing potential medical products are commonly classified into four phases. The drug development process will normally proceed through all four phases over many years. When expressed specifically, a clinical trial phase is capitalized both in name and Roman numeral, such as "Phase I" clinical trial.

If the drug successfully passes through Phases I, II, and III, it will usually be approved by the national regulatory authority for use in the general population. Phase IV trials are 'post-marketing' or 'surveillance' studies conducted to monitor safety over several years.

Summary of clinical trial phases
Phase	Primary goal	Dose	Patient monitor	Typical number of participants	Success rate	Notes
Preclinical	Testing of drug in non-human subjects to gather efficacy, toxicity and pharmacokinetic information	Unrestricted	Scientific researcher	No human subjects, in vitro and in vivo only		Includes testing in model organisms. Human immortalized cell lines and other human tissues may also be used.
Phase 0	Pharmacokinetics; particularly oral bioavailability and half-life of the drug	Small, subtherapeutic	Clinical researcher	10 people		Often skipped for Phase I.
Phase I	Dose-ranging on healthy volunteers for safety	Often subtherapeutic, but with ascending doses	Clinical researcher	20–100 normal healthy volunteers (or cancer patients for cancer drugs)	Approx. 52%	Determines whether drug is safe to check for efficacy.
Phase II	Testing of drug on participants to assess efficacy and side effects	Therapeutic dose	Clinical researcher	100–300 participants with a specific disease	Approx. 28.9%	Determines whether drug can have any efficacy; at this point, the drug is not presumed to have any therapeutic effect
Phase III	Testing of drug on participants to assess efficacy, effectiveness and safety	Therapeutic dose	Clinical researcher and personal physician	300–3,000 people with a specific disease	57.8%	Determines a drug's therapeutic effect; at this point, the drug is presumed to have some effect
Phase IV	Post marketing surveillance in public	Therapeutic dose	Personal physician	Anyone seeking treatment from a physician	N/A	Monitor long-term effects

== Preclinical studies ==
Before clinical trials are undertaken for a candidate drug, vaccine, medical device, or diagnostic assay, the product candidate is tested extensively in preclinical studies. Such studies involve in vitro (test tube or cell culture) and in vivo (animal model) experiments using wide-ranging doses of the study agent to obtain preliminary efficacy, toxicity and pharmacokinetic information. Such tests assist the developer to decide whether a drug candidate has scientific merit for further development as an investigational new drug.

== Phase 0 ==
Phase 0 is a designation for optional exploratory trials, originally introduced by the United States Food and Drug Administration's (FDA) 2006 Guidance on Exploratory Investigational New Drug (IND) Studies, but now generally adopted as standard practice. Phase 0 trials are also known as human microdosing studies and are designed to speed up the development of promising drugs or imaging agents by establishing very early on whether the drug or agent behaves in human subjects as was expected from preclinical studies. Distinctive features of Phase 0 trials include the administration of single subtherapeutic doses of the study drug to a small number of subjects (10 to 15) to gather preliminary data on the agent's pharmacokinetics (what the body does to the drugs).

A Phase 0 study gives no data on safety or efficacy, being by definition a dose too low to cause any therapeutic effect. Drug development companies carry out Phase 0 studies to rank drug candidates to decide which has the best pharmacokinetic parameters in humans to take forward into further development. They enable go/no-go decisions to be based on relevant human models instead of relying on sometimes inconsistent animal data.

== Phase I ==
Phase I trials were formerly referred to as "first-in-man studies" but the field generally moved to the gender-neutral language phrase "first-in-humans" in the 1990s; these trials are the first stage of testing in human subjects. They are designed to test the safety, side effects, best dose, and formulation method for the drug. Phase I trials are not randomized, and thus are vulnerable to selection bias.

Normally, a small group of 20–100 healthy volunteers will be recruited.

The subject who receives the drug is usually observed until several half-lives of the drug have passed. This phase is designed to assess the safety (pharmacovigilance), tolerability, pharmacokinetics, and pharmacodynamics of a drug. Phase I trials normally include dose-ranging, also called dose escalation studies, so that the best and safest dose can be found and to discover the point at which a compound is too poisonous to administer.

Phase I trials most often include healthy volunteers. However, there are some circumstances when clinical patients are used, such as patients who have terminal cancer or HIV and the treatment is likely to make healthy individuals ill. These studies are usually conducted in tightly controlled clinics called Central Pharmacological Units, where participants receive 24-hour medical attention and oversight. In addition to the previously mentioned unhealthy individuals, "patients who have typically already tried and failed to improve on the existing standard therapies" may also participate in Phase I trials. Volunteers are paid a variable inconvenience fee for their time spent in the volunteer center.

Before beginning a Phase I trial, the sponsor must submit an Investigational New Drug application to the FDA detailing the preliminary data on the drug gathered from cellular models and animal studies.

Phase I trials can be further divided:

=== Phase Ia ===
Single ascending dose (Phase Ia): In single ascending dose studies, small groups of subjects are given a single dose of the drug while they are observed and tested for a period of time to confirm safety. Typically, a small number of participants, usually three, are entered sequentially at a particular dose. If they do not exhibit any adverse side effects, and the pharmacokinetic data are roughly in line with predicted safe values, the dose is escalated, and a new group of subjects is then given a higher dose.

If unacceptable toxicity is observed in any of the three participants, an additional number of participants, usually three, are treated at the same dose. This is continued until pre-calculated pharmacokinetic safety levels are reached, or intolerable side effects start showing up (at which point the drug is said to have reached the maximum tolerated dose (MTD)). If an additional unacceptable toxicity is observed, then the dose escalation is terminated and that dose, or perhaps the previous dose, is declared to be the maximally tolerated dose. This particular design assumes that the maximally tolerated dose occurs when approximately one-third of the participants experience unacceptable toxicity. Variations of this design exist, but most are similar.

=== Phase Ib ===
Multiple ascending dose (Phase Ib): Multiple ascending dose studies investigate the pharmacokinetics and pharmacodynamics of multiple doses of the drug, looking at safety and tolerability. In these studies, a group of patients receives multiple low doses of the drug, while samples (of blood, and other fluids) are collected at various time points and analyzed to acquire information on how the drug is processed within the body. The dose is subsequently escalated for further groups, up to a predetermined level.

=== Food effect ===
A short trial designed to investigate any differences in absorption of the drug by the body, caused by eating before the drug is given. These studies are usually run as a crossover study, with volunteers being given two identical doses of the drug while fasted, and after being fed.

== Phase II ==
Once a dose or range of doses is determined, the next goal is to evaluate whether the drug has any biological activity or effect. Phase II trials are performed on larger groups (50–300 individuals) and are designed to assess how well the drug works, as well as to continue Phase I safety assessments in a larger group of volunteers and patients. Genetic testing is common, particularly when there is evidence of variation in metabolic rate. When the development process for a new drug fails, this usually occurs during Phase II trials when the drug is discovered not to work as planned, or to have toxic effects.

Phase II studies are sometimes divided into Phase IIa and Phase IIb. There is no formal definition for these two sub-categories, but generally:

- Phase IIa studies are usually pilot studies designed to find an optimal dose and assess safety ('dose finding' studies).
- Phase IIb studies determine how well the drug works in subjects at a given dose to assess efficacy ('proof of concept' studies).

=== Trial design ===
Some Phase II trials are designed as case series, demonstrating a drug's safety and activity in a selected group of participants. Other Phase II trials are designed as randomized controlled trials, where some patients receive the drug/device and others receive placebo/standard treatment. Randomized Phase II trials have far fewer patients than randomized Phase III trials.

==== Example: cancer design ====
In the first stage, the investigator attempts to rule out drugs that have no or little biologic activity. For example, the researcher may specify that a drug must have some minimal level of activity, say, in 20% of participants. If the estimated activity level is less than 20%, the researcher chooses not to consider this drug further, at least not at that maximally tolerated dose. If the estimated activity level exceeds 20%, the researcher will add more participants to get a better estimate of the response rate. A typical study for ruling out a 20% or lower response rate enters 14 participants. If no response is observed in the first 14 participants, the drug is considered not likely to have a 20% or higher activity level. The number of additional participants added depends on the degree of precision desired, but ranges from 10 to 20. Thus, a typical cancer phase II study might include fewer than 30 people to estimate the response rate.

==== Efficacy vs effectiveness ====
When a study assesses efficacy, it is looking at whether the drug given in the specific manner described in the study is able to influence an outcome of interest (e.g. tumor size) in the chosen population (e.g. cancer patients with no other ongoing diseases). When a study is assessing effectiveness, it is determining whether a treatment will influence the disease. In an effectiveness study, it is essential that participants are treated as they would be when the treatment is prescribed in actual practice. That would mean that there should be no aspects of the study designed to increase compliance above those that would occur in routine clinical practice. The outcomes in effectiveness studies are also more generally applicable than in most efficacy studies (for example does the patient feel better, come to the hospital less or live longer in effectiveness studies as opposed to better test scores or lower cell counts in efficacy studies). There is usually less rigid control of the type of participant to be included in effectiveness studies than in efficacy studies, as the researchers are interested in whether the drug will have a broad effect in the population of patients with the disease.

=== Failure rate ===
Phase I trials historically have experienced the lowest success, having about a 66% failure rate due mainly to adverse effects and other toxicity concerns. A 2022 review found that about 90% of drug candidates fail over the course of Phases I-III, mainly due to absence of therapeutic efficacy, toxicity, non-specific drug properties, poor strategic planning, and recognition that the compound will not succeed commercially.

== Phase III ==
This phase is designed to assess the effectiveness of the new intervention and, thereby, its value in clinical practice. Phase III studies are randomized controlled multicenter trials on large patient groups (300–3,000 or more depending upon the disease/medical condition studied) and are aimed at being the definitive assessment of how effective the drug is, in comparison with current 'gold standard' treatment. Because of their size and comparatively long duration, Phase III trials are the most expensive, time-consuming and difficult trials to design and run, especially in therapies for chronic medical conditions. Phase III trials of chronic conditions or diseases often have a short follow-up period for evaluation, relative to the period of time the intervention might be used in practice.

It is common practice that certain Phase III trials will continue while the regulatory submission is pending at the appropriate regulatory agency. This allows patients to continue to receive possibly lifesaving drugs until the drug can be obtained by purchase. Other reasons for performing trials at this stage include attempts by the sponsor at "label expansion" (to show the drug works for additional types of patients/diseases beyond the original use for which the drug was approved for marketing), to obtain additional safety data, or to support marketing claims for the drug. Studies in this phase are by some companies categorized as "Phase IIIB studies."

While not required in all cases, it is typically expected that there be at least two successful Phase III trials, demonstrating a drug's safety and efficacy, to obtain approval from the appropriate regulatory agencies such as FDA (US), or the EMA (European Union).

Once a drug has proved satisfactory after Phase III trials, the trial results are usually combined into a large document containing a comprehensive description of the methods and results of human and animal studies, manufacturing procedures, formulation details, and shelf life. This collection of information makes up the "regulatory submission" that is provided for review to the appropriate regulatory authorities in different countries. They will review the submission, and if it is acceptable, give the sponsor approval to market the drug.

Most drugs undergoing Phase III clinical trials can be marketed under FDA norms with proper recommendations and guidelines through a New Drug Application (NDA) containing all manufacturing, preclinical, and clinical data. In case of any adverse effects being reported anywhere, the drugs need to be recalled immediately from the market. While most pharmaceutical companies refrain from this practice, it is not abnormal to see many drugs undergoing Phase III clinical trials in the market.

=== Adaptive design ===
The design of individual trials may be altered during a trial – usually during Phase II or III – to accommodate interim results for the benefit of the treatment, adjust statistical analysis, or to reach early termination of an unsuccessful design, a process called an "adaptive design". Examples are the 2020 World Health Organization Solidarity trial, European Discovery trial, and UK RECOVERY Trial of hospitalized people with severe COVID-19 infection, each of which applies adaptive designs to rapidly alter trial parameters as results from the experimental therapeutic strategies emerge.

Adaptive designs within ongoing Phase II–III clinical trials on candidate therapeutics may shorten trial durations and use fewer subjects, possibly expediting decisions for early termination or success, and coordinating design changes for a specific trial across its international locations.

=== Failure rate ===
Some 90% of drug candidates fail once entering Phase I trials. A 2019 review of average success rates of clinical trials at different phases and diseases over the years 2005–15 found a success range of only 5–14% overall. Separated by diseases studied, cancer drug trials were on average only 3% successful, whereas ophthalmology drugs and vaccines for infectious diseases were 33% successful. Trials using disease biomarkers, especially in cancer studies, were more successful than those not using biomarkers. A 2010 review found about 50% of drug candidates either fail during the Phase III trial or are rejected by the national regulatory agency.

For vaccines, the overall probability of success ranges from 7% for non-industry-sponsored candidates to 40% for industry-sponsored candidates.

== Cost of trials by phases ==
From discovery in the laboratory of a molecule with drug potential through the years-long process establishing an approved drug, the overall cost of development through all the stages of preclinical and clinical research is about $2 billion.

In the early 21st century, a typical Phase I trial conducted at a single clinic in the United States ranged from $1.4 million for pain or anesthesia studies to $6.6 million for immunomodulation studies. Main expense drivers were operating and clinical monitoring costs of the Phase I site.

The amount of money spent on Phase II or III trials depends on numerous factors, with therapeutic area being studied and types of clinical procedures as key drivers. Phase II studies may cost as low as $7 million for cardiovascular projects, and as much as $20 million for hematology trials.

Phase III trials for dermatology may cost as low as $11 million, whereas a pain or anesthesia Phase III trial may cost as much as $53 million. An analysis of Phase III pivotal trials leading to 59 drug approvals by the US Food and Drug Administration over 2015–16 showed that the median cost was $19 million, but some trials involving thousands of subjects may cost 100 times more.

Across all trial phases, the main expenses for clinical trials were administrative staff (about 20% of the total), clinical procedures (about 19%), and clinical monitoring of the subjects (about 11%).

== Phase IV ==
A Phase IV trial is also known as a postmarketing surveillance trial or drug monitoring trial to assure long-term safety and effectiveness of the drug, vaccine, device or diagnostic test. Phase IV trials involve the safety surveillance (pharmacovigilance) and ongoing technical support of a drug after it receives regulatory approval to be sold. Phase IV studies may be required by regulatory authorities or may be undertaken by the sponsoring company for competitive (finding a new market for the drug) or other reasons (for example, the drug may not have been tested for interactions with other drugs, or on certain population groups such as pregnant women, who are unlikely to subject themselves to trials). The safety surveillance is designed to detect any rare or long-term adverse effects over a much larger patient population and longer time period than was possible during the Phase I-III clinical trials. Harmful effects discovered by Phase IV trials may result in a drug being withdrawn from the market or restricted to certain uses; examples include cerivastatin (brand names Baycol and Lipobay), troglitazone (Rezulin) and rofecoxib (Vioxx).

== See also ==
- Lists of investigational drugs
