= Scientific theory =

Falsifiable explanation of natural phenomena

A scientific theory is an explanation of an aspect of the natural world that can be or that has been repeatedly tested and has corroborating evidence in accordance with the scientific method, using accepted protocols of observation, measurement, and evaluation of results. Where possible, theories are tested under controlled conditions in an experiment. In circumstances not amenable to experimental testing, theories are evaluated through principles of abductive reasoning. Established scientific theories have withstood rigorous scrutiny and embody scientific knowledge.

A scientific theory differs from a scientific fact: a fact is an observation, while a theory connects and explains multiple observations. Furthermore, a theory is expected to make predictions which could be confirmed or refuted with additional observations. Stephen Jay Gould wrote that: "...facts and theories are different things, not rungs in a hierarchy of increasing certainty. Facts are the world's data. Theories are structures of ideas that explain and interpret facts." A theory differs from a scientific law in that a law is an empirical description of a relationship between facts and/or other laws. For example, Newton's Law of Gravity is a mathematical equation that can be used to predict the attraction between bodies, but it is not a theory to explain how gravity works.

The meaning of the term scientific theory (often contracted to theory for brevity) as used in the disciplines of science is significantly different from the common vernacular usage of theory. In everyday speech, theory can imply an explanation that represents an unsubstantiated and speculative guess, whereas in a scientific context it most often refers to an explanation that has already been tested and is widely accepted as valid.

The strength of a scientific theory is related to the diversity of phenomena it can explain and its simplicity. As additional scientific evidence is gathered, a scientific theory may be modified and ultimately rejected if it cannot be made to fit the new findings; in such circumstances, a more accurate theory is then required. Some theories are so well-established that they are unlikely ever to be fundamentally changed (for example, scientific theories such as evolution, heliocentric theory, cell theory, theory of plate tectonics, germ theory of disease, etc.). In certain cases, a scientific theory or scientific law that fails to fit all data can still be useful (due to its simplicity) as an approximation under specific conditions. An example is Newton's laws of motion, which are a highly accurate approximation to special relativity at velocities that are small relative to the speed of light.

Scientific theories are testable and make verifiable predictions. They describe the causes of a particular natural phenomenon and are used to explain and predict aspects of the physical universe or specific areas of inquiry (for example, electricity, chemistry, and astronomy). As with other forms of scientific knowledge, scientific theories are both deductive and inductive, aiming for predictive and explanatory power. Scientists use theories to further scientific knowledge, as well as to facilitate advances in technology or medicine. Scientific hypotheses can never be "proven" because scientists are not able to fully confirm that their hypothesis is true. Instead, scientists say that the study "supports" or is consistent with their hypothesis.

== Types ==
Albert Einstein described two different types of scientific theories: "Constructive theories" and "principle theories". Constructive theories are constructive models for phenomena: for example, kinetic theory. Principle theories are empirical generalisations, one such example being Newton's laws of motion.

== Characteristics ==
The structural elements of a scientific theory include:

- A purpose, for example to improve understanding or to challenge an existing understanding,
- A target phenomenon, what the theory is about,
- A conceptual order, providing a relationship among the key variables and highlighting key aspects of the phenomenon to be understood by the theory,
- intellectual insight, the theory should give a qualified reader a better or different way of thinking about the phenomenon, something outside common sense,
- relevance criteria, a means of assessing the success of the theory in creating new understanding,
- empirical support, experimental data or observations confirming the predictions of the theory,
- boundary conditions, inclusion and exclusion conditions and its possible application arenas.

=== Essential criteria ===
For any theory to be accepted within most academia there is usually one simple criterion. The essential criterion is that the theory must be observable and repeatable. The aforementioned criterion is essential to prevent fraud and perpetuate science itself.

The tectonic plates of the world were mapped in the second half of the 20th century. Plate tectonic theory successfully explains numerous observations about the Earth, including the distribution of earthquakes, mountains, continents, and oceans.

The defining characteristic of all scientific knowledge, including theories, is the ability to make falsifiable or testable predictions. The relevance and specificity of those predictions determine how potentially useful the theory is. A would-be theory that makes no observable predictions is not a scientific theory at all. Predictions not sufficiently specific to be tested are similarly not useful. In both cases, the term "theory" is not applicable.

A body of descriptions of knowledge can be called a theory if it fulfills the following criteria:

- It makes falsifiable predictions with consistent accuracy across a broad area of scientific inquiry (such as mechanics).
- It is well-supported by many independent strands of evidence, rather than a single foundation.
- It is consistent with preexisting experimental results and at least as accurate in its predictions as are any preexisting theories.

These qualities are certainly true of such established theories as special and general relativity, quantum mechanics, plate tectonics, the modern evolutionary synthesis, etc.

=== Other criteria ===
In addition, most scientists prefer to work with a theory that meets the following qualities:

- It can be subjected to minor adaptations to account for new data that do not fit it perfectly, as they are discovered, thus increasing its predictive capability over time.
- It is among the most parsimonious explanations, economical in the use of proposed entities or explanatory steps as per Occam's razor. This is because for each accepted explanation of a phenomenon, there may be an extremely large, perhaps even incomprehensible, number of possible and more complex alternatives, because one can always burden failing explanations with ad hoc hypotheses to prevent them from being falsified; therefore, simpler theories are preferable to more complex ones because they are more testable.

=== Definitions from scientific organizations ===
The United States National Academy of Sciences defines scientific theories as follows:

The formal scientific definition of theory is quite different from the everyday meaning of the word. It refers to a comprehensive explanation of some aspect of nature that is supported by a vast body of evidence. Many scientific theories are so well established that no new evidence is likely to alter them substantially. For example, no new evidence will demonstrate that the Earth does not orbit around the Sun (heliocentric theory), or that living things are not made of cells (cell theory), that matter is not composed of atoms, or that the surface of the Earth is not divided into solid plates that have moved over geological timescales (the theory of plate tectonics)...One of the most useful properties of scientific theories is that they can be used to make predictions about natural events or phenomena that have not yet been observed.

From the American Association for the Advancement of Science:

A scientific theory is a well-substantiated explanation of some aspect of the natural world, based on a body of facts that have been repeatedly confirmed through observation and experiment. Such fact-supported theories are not "guesses" but reliable accounts of the real world. The theory of biological evolution is more than "just a theory". It is as factual an explanation of the universe as the atomic theory of matter or the germ theory of disease. Our understanding of gravity is still a work in progress. But the phenomenon of gravity, like evolution, is an accepted fact.

Note that the term theory would not be appropriate for describing untested but intricate hypotheses or even scientific models.

== Formation ==
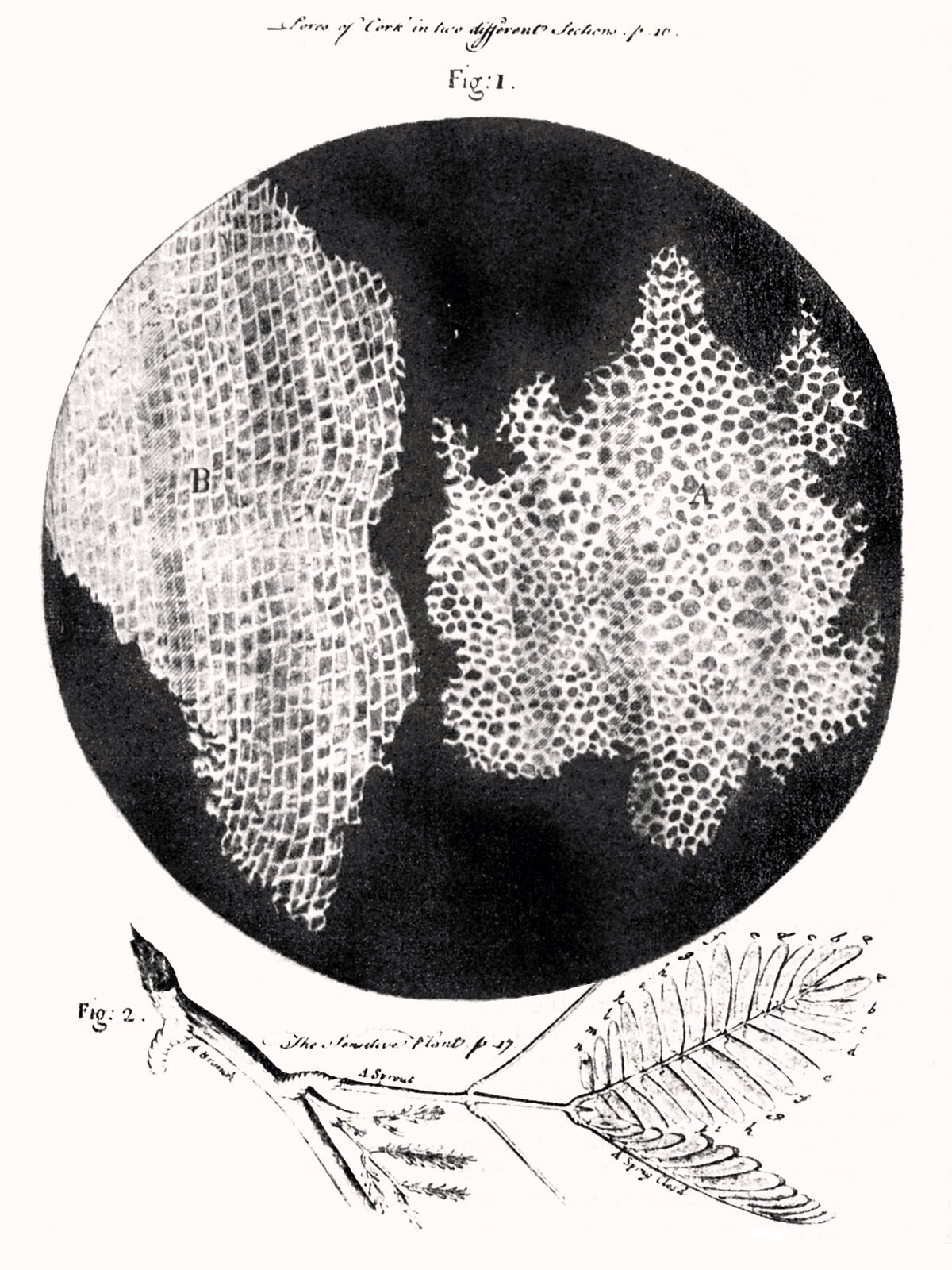
The first observation of cells, by Robert Hooke, using an early microscope. This led to the development of cell theory.

The scientific method involves the proposal and testing of hypotheses, by deriving predictions from the hypotheses about the results of future experiments, then performing those experiments to see whether the predictions are valid. This provides evidence either for or against the hypothesis. When enough experimental results have been gathered in a particular area of inquiry, scientists may propose an explanatory framework that accounts for as many of these as possible. This explanation is also tested, and if it fulfills the necessary criteria (see above), then the explanation becomes a theory. This can take many years, as it can be difficult or complicated to gather sufficient evidence. Once all of the criteria have been met, it will be widely accepted by scientists (see scientific consensus) as the best available explanation of at least some phenomena. It will have made predictions of phenomena that previous theories could not explain or could not predict accurately, and it will have many repeated bouts of testing. The strength of the evidence is evaluated by the scientific community, and the most important experiments will have been replicated by multiple independent groups.

Theories do not have to be perfectly accurate to be scientifically useful. For example, the predictions made by classical mechanics are known to be inaccurate in the relativistic realm, but they are almost exactly correct at the comparatively low velocities of common human experience. In chemistry, there are many acid-base theories providing highly divergent explanations of the underlying nature of acidic and basic compounds, but they are very useful for predicting their chemical behavior. Like all knowledge in science, no theory can ever be completely certain, since it is possible that future experiments might conflict with the theory's predictions. However, theories supported by the scientific consensus have the highest level of certainty of any scientific knowledge; for example, that all objects are subject to gravity or that life on Earth evolved from a common ancestor.

Acceptance of a theory does not require that all of its major predictions be tested if it is already supported by sufficient evidence. For example, certain tests may be unfeasible or technically difficult. As a result, theories may make predictions that have not yet been confirmed or proven incorrect; in this case, the predicted results may be described informally with the term "theoretical". These predictions can be tested at a later time, and if they are incorrect, this may lead to the revision or rejection of the theory. As Richard Feynman puts it:

It doesn't matter how beautiful your theory is, it doesn't matter how smart you are. If it doesn't agree with experiment, it's wrong.

== Modification and improvement ==
If experimental results contrary to a theory's predictions are observed, scientists first evaluate whether the experimental design was sound, and if so they confirm the results by independent replication. A search for potential improvements to the theory then begins. Solutions may require minor or major changes to the theory, or none at all if a satisfactory explanation is found within the theory's existing framework. Over time, as successive modifications build on top of each other, theories consistently improve and greater predictive accuracy is achieved. Since each new version of a theory (or a completely new theory) must have more predictive and explanatory power than the last, scientific knowledge consistently becomes more accurate over time.

If modifications to the theory or other explanations seem to be insufficient to account for the new results, then a new theory may be required. Since scientific knowledge is usually durable, this occurs much less commonly than modification. Furthermore, until such a theory is proposed and accepted, the previous theory will be retained. This is because it is still the best available explanation for many other phenomena, as verified by its predictive power in other contexts. For example, it has been known since 1859 that the observed perihelion precession of Mercury violates Newtonian mechanics, but the theory remained the best explanation available until relativity was supported by sufficient evidence. Also, while new theories may be proposed by a single person or by many, the cycle of modifications eventually incorporates contributions from many different scientists.

After the changes, the accepted theory will explain more phenomena and have greater predictive power (if it did not, the changes would not be adopted); this new explanation will then be open to further replacement or modification. If a theory does not require modification despite repeated tests, this implies that the theory is very accurate. This also means that accepted theories continue to accumulate evidence over time, and the length of time that a theory (or any of its principles) remains accepted often indicates the strength of its supporting evidence.

=== Unification ===
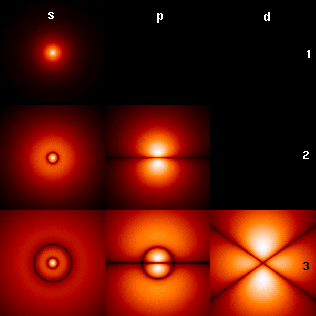
In quantum mechanics, the electrons of an atom occupy orbitals around the nucleus. This image shows the orbitals of a hydrogen atom (s, p, d) at three different energy levels (1, 2, 3). Brighter areas correspond to higher probability density.

In some cases, two or more theories may be replaced by a single theory that explains the previous theories as approximations or special cases, analogous to the way a theory is a unifying explanation for many confirmed hypotheses; this is referred to as unification of theories. For example, electricity and magnetism are now known to be two aspects of the same phenomenon, referred to as electromagnetism.

When the predictions of different theories appear to contradict each other, this is also resolved by either further evidence or unification. For example, physical theories in the 19th century implied that the Sun could not have been burning long enough to allow certain geological changes as well as the evolution of life. This was resolved by the discovery of nuclear fusion, the main energy source of the Sun. Contradictions can also be explained as the result of theories approximating more fundamental (non-contradictory) phenomena. For example, atomic theory is an approximation of quantum mechanics. Current theories describe three separate fundamental phenomena of which all other theories are approximations; The potential unification of these is sometimes called the Theory of Everything.

=== Example: Relativity ===
In 1905, Albert Einstein published the theory of special relativity. He started with a principle known for three hundred years, since the time of Galileo Galilei: the principle of relativity and a prediction from a well established theory for electromagnetism known as Maxwell's equations, the prediction that the speed of light in a vacuum does not depend on relative motion of the source and receiver. Einstein proposed, or hypothesized, that the concept of Galilean relativity should be modified to align mechanical physics with electromagnetism. In addition to unifying two branches of physics, this modification led to specific consequences such as time dilation and length contraction. Careful, repeated experiments have both confirmed Einstein's postulates are valid and that the predictions of the special theory of relativity match experiment.

Einstein next sought to generalize the invariance principle to all reference frames, whether inertial or accelerating. Rejecting Newtonian gravitation—a central force acting instantly at a distance—Einstein presumed a gravitational field. In 1907, Einstein's equivalence principle implied that a free fall within a uniform gravitational field is equivalent to inertial motion. By extending special relativity's effects into three dimensions, general relativity extended length contraction into space contraction, conceiving of 4D space-time as the gravitational field that alters geometrically and sets all local objects' pathways. Even massless energy exerts gravitational motion on local objects by "curving" the geometrical "surface" of 4D space-time. Yet unless the energy is vast, its relativistic effects of contracting space and slowing time are negligible when merely predicting motion. Although general relativity is embraced as the more explanatory theory via scientific realism, Newton's theory remains successful as merely a predictive theory via instrumentalism. To calculate trajectories, engineers and NASA still use Newton's equations, which are simpler to operate.

== Theories and laws ==
Both scientific laws and scientific theories are produced from the scientific method through the formation and testing of hypotheses and can predict the behavior of the natural world. Both are also typically well-supported by observations and/or experimental evidence. However, scientific laws are descriptive accounts of how nature will behave under certain conditions. Scientific theories are broader in scope and give overarching explanations of how nature works and why it exhibits certain characteristics. Theories are supported by evidence from many different sources and may contain one or several laws.

A common misconception is that scientific theories are rudimentary ideas that will eventually graduate into scientific laws when enough data and evidence have been accumulated. A theory does not change into a scientific law with the accumulation of new or better evidence. A theory will always remain a theory; a law will always remain a law. Both theories and laws could potentially be falsified by countervailing evidence.

=== Theories and facts ===
A scientific theory does not turn into a fact. Scientific facts are observations that theories organize and explain. As new facts appear, a theory may be revised or new theories may emerge that encompass these additional facts. While American vernacular speech uses "theory" as similar to a "guess" in opposition to a "fact", in science the word "theory" means a model that is expected to explain a wide range of facts.

== About theories ==
=== Theories as axioms ===
The logical positivists thought of scientific theories as statements in a formal language. First-order logic is an example of a formal language. The logical positivists envisaged a similar scientific language. In addition to scientific theories, the language also included observation sentences ("the sun rises in the east"), definitions, and mathematical statements. The phenomena explained by the theories, if they could not be directly observed by the senses (for example, atoms and radio waves), were treated as theoretical concepts. In this view, theories function as axioms: predicted observations are derived from the theories much like theorems are derived in Euclidean geometry. However, the predictions are then tested against reality to verify the predictions, and the "axioms" can be revised as a direct result.

The phrase "the received view of theories" is used to describe this approach. Terms commonly associated with it are "linguistic" (because theories are components of a language) and "syntactic" (because a language has rules about how symbols can be strung together). Problems in defining this kind of language precisely, e.g., are objects seen in microscopes observed or are they theoretical objects, led to the effective demise of logical positivism in the 1970s.

=== Theories as models ===
The semantic view of theories, which identifies scientific theories with models rather than propositions, has replaced the received view as the dominant position in theory formulation in the philosophy of science. A model is a logical framework intended to represent reality (a "model of reality"), similar to the way that a map is a graphical model that represents the territory of a city or country.

Precession of the perihelion of Mercury (exaggerated). The deviation in Mercury's position from the Newtonian prediction is about 43 arc-seconds (about two-thirds of 1/60 of a degree) per century.

In this approach, theories are a specific category of models that fulfil the necessary criteria (see above). One can use language to describe a model; however, the theory is the model (or a collection of similar models), and not the description of the model. A model of the Solar System, for example, might consist of abstract objects that represent the Sun and the planets. These objects have associated properties, e.g., positions, velocities, and masses. The model parameters, e.g., Newton's Law of Gravitation, determine how the positions and velocities change with time. This model can then be tested to see whether it accurately predicts future observations; astronomers can verify that the positions of the model's objects over time match the actual positions of the planets. For most planets, the Newtonian model's predictions are accurate; for Mercury, it is slightly inaccurate and the model of general relativity must be used instead.

The word "semantic" refers to the way that a model represents the real world. The representation (literally, "re-presentation") describes particular aspects of a phenomenon or the manner of interaction among a set of phenomena. For instance, a scale model of a house or of the Solar System is clearly not an actual house or an actual Solar System; the aspects of an actual house or the actual Solar System represented in a scale model are, only in certain limited ways, representative of the actual entity. A scale model of a house is not a house; but to someone who wants to learn about houses, analogous to a scientist who wants to understand reality, a sufficiently detailed scale model may suffice.

==== Differences between theory and model ====
Several commentators have stated that the distinguishing characteristic of theories is that they are explanatory as well as descriptive, while models are only descriptive (although still predictive in a more limited sense). Philosopher Stephen Pepper also distinguished between theories and models and said in 1948 that general models and theories are predicated on a "root" metaphor that constrains how scientists theorize and model a phenomenon and thus arrive at testable hypotheses.

Engineering practice makes a distinction between "mathematical models" and "physical models"; the cost of fabricating a physical model can be minimized by first creating a mathematical model using a computer software package, such as a computer-aided design tool. The component parts are each themselves modelled, and the fabrication tolerances are specified. An exploded view drawing is used to lay out the fabrication sequence. Simulation packages for displaying each of the subassemblies allow the parts to be rotated, and magnified, in realistic detail. Software packages for creating the bill of materials for construction allow subcontractors to specialize in assembly processes, which spreads the cost of manufacturing machinery among multiple customers. See: Computer-aided engineering, Computer-aided manufacturing, and 3D printing

=== Assumptions in formulating theories ===
An assumption (or axiom) is a statement that is accepted without evidence. For example, assumptions can be used as premises in a logical argument. Isaac Asimov described assumptions as follows:

...it is incorrect to speak of an assumption as either true or false, since there is no way of proving it to be either (If there were, it would no longer be an assumption). It is better to consider assumptions as either useful or useless, depending on whether deductions made from them correspond to reality...Since we must start somewhere, we must have assumptions, but at least let us have as few assumptions as possible.

Certain assumptions are necessary for all empirical claims (e.g. the assumption that reality exists). However, theories do not generally make assumptions in the conventional sense (statements accepted without evidence). While assumptions are often incorporated during the formation of new theories, these are either supported by evidence (such as from previously existing theories) or the evidence is produced in the course of validating the theory. This may be as simple as observing that the theory makes accurate predictions, which is evidence that any assumptions made at the outset are correct or approximately correct under the conditions tested.

Conventional assumptions, without evidence, may be used if the theory is only intended to apply when the assumption is valid (or approximately valid). For example, the special theory of relativity assumes an inertial frame of reference. The theory makes accurate predictions when the assumption is valid, and does not make accurate predictions when the assumption is not valid. Such assumptions are often the point with which older theories are succeeded by new ones (the general theory of relativity works in non-inertial reference frames as well).

The term "assumption" is actually broader than its standard use, etymologically speaking. The Oxford English Dictionary (OED) and online Wiktionary indicate its Latin source as assumere ("accept, to take to oneself, adopt, usurp"), which is a conjunction of ad- ("to, towards, at") and sumere (to take). The root survives, with shifted meanings, in the Italian assumere and Spanish sumir. The first sense of "assume" in the OED is "to take unto (oneself), receive, accept, adopt". The term was originally employed in religious contexts as in "to receive up into heaven", especially "the reception of the Virgin Mary into heaven, with body preserved from corruption", (1297 CE) but it was also simply used to refer to "receive into association" or "adopt into partnership". Moreover, other senses of assumere included (i) "investing oneself with (an attribute)", (ii) "to undertake" (especially in Law), (iii) "to take to oneself in appearance only, to pretend to possess", and (iv) "to suppose a thing to be" (all senses from OED entry on "assume"; the OED entry for "assumption" is almost perfectly symmetrical in senses). Thus, "assumption" connotes other associations than the contemporary standard sense of "that which is assumed or taken for granted; a supposition, postulate" (only the 11th of 12 senses of "assumption", and the 10th of 11 senses of "assume").

== Descriptions ==
=== From philosophers of science ===
Karl Popper described the characteristics of a scientific theory as follows:

1. It is easy to obtain confirmations, or verifications, for nearly every theory—if we look for confirmations.
2. Confirmations should count only if they are the result of risky predictions; that is to say, if, unenlightened by the theory in question, we should have expected an event which was incompatible with the theory—an event which would have refuted the theory.
3. Every "good" scientific theory is a prohibition: it forbids certain things from happening. The more a theory forbids, the better it is.
4. A theory which is not refutable by any conceivable event is non-scientific. Irrefutability is not a virtue of a theory (as people often think) but a vice.
5. Every genuine test of a theory is an attempt to falsify it or to refute it. Testability is falsifiability; but there are degrees of testability: some theories are more testable, more exposed to refutation, than others; they take, as it were, greater risks.
6. Confirming evidence should not count except when it is the result of a genuine test of the theory, and this means that it can be presented as a serious but unsuccessful attempt to falsify the theory. (I now speak in such cases of "corroborating evidence".)
7. Some genuinely testable theories, when found to be false, might still be upheld by their admirers—for example by introducing post hoc (after the fact) some auxiliary hypothesis or assumption, or by reinterpreting the theory post hoc in such a way that it escapes refutation. Such a procedure is always possible, but it rescues the theory from refutation only at the price of destroying, or at least lowering, its scientific status, by tampering with evidence. The temptation to tamper can be minimized by first taking the time to write down the testing protocol before embarking on the scientific work.

Popper summarized these statements by saying that the central criterion of the scientific status of a theory is its "falsifiability, or refutability, or testability". Echoing this, Stephen Hawking states, "A theory is a good theory if it satisfies two requirements: It must accurately describe a large class of observations on the basis of a model that contains only a few arbitrary elements, and it must make definite predictions about the results of future observations." He also discusses the "unprovable but falsifiable" nature of theories, which is a necessary consequence of inductive logic, and that "you can disprove a theory by finding even a single observation that disagrees with the predictions of the theory".

Several philosophers and historians of science have, however, argued that Popper's definition of theory as a set of falsifiable statements is wrong because, as Philip Kitcher has pointed out, if one took a strictly Popperian view of "theory", observations of Uranus when first discovered in 1781 would have "falsified" Newton's celestial mechanics. Rather, people suggested that another planet influenced Uranus' orbit—and this prediction was indeed eventually confirmed.

Kitcher agrees with Popper that "There is surely something right in the idea that a science can succeed only if it can fail." He also says that scientific theories include statements that cannot be falsified, and that good theories must also be creative. He insists we view scientific theories as an "elaborate collection of statements", some of which are not falsifiable, while others—those he calls "auxiliary hypotheses", are.

According to Kitcher, good scientific theories must have three features:

1. Unity: "A science should be unified.... Good theories consist of just one problem-solving strategy, or a small family of problem-solving strategies, that can be applied to a wide range of problems."
2. Fecundity: "A great scientific theory, like Newton's, opens up new areas of research.... Because a theory presents a new way of looking at the world, it can lead us to ask new questions, and so to embark on new and fruitful lines of inquiry.... Typically, a flourishing science is incomplete. At any time, it raises more questions than it can currently answer. But incompleteness is not vice. On the contrary, incompleteness is the mother of fecundity.... A good theory should be productive; it should raise new questions and presume those questions can be answered without giving up its problem-solving strategies."
3. Auxiliary hypotheses that are independently testable: "An auxiliary hypothesis ought to be testable independently of the particular problem it is introduced to solve, independently of the theory it is designed to save." (For example, the evidence for the existence of Neptune is independent of the anomalies in Uranus's orbit.)

Like other definitions of theories, including Popper's, Kitcher makes it clear that a theory must include statements that have observational consequences. But, like the observation of irregularities in the orbit of Uranus, falsification is only one possible consequence of observation. The production of new hypotheses is another possible and equally important result.

=== Analogies and metaphors ===
The concept of a scientific theory has also been described using analogies and metaphors. For example, the logical empiricist Carl Gustav Hempel likened the structure of a scientific theory to a "complex spatial network:"

Its terms are represented by the knots, while the threads connecting the latter correspond, in part, to the definitions and, in part, to the fundamental and derivative hypotheses included in the theory. The whole system floats, as it were, above the plane of observation and is anchored to it by the rules of interpretation. These might be viewed as strings which are not part of the network but link certain points of the latter with specific places in the plane of observation. By virtue of these interpretive connections, the network can function as a scientific theory: From certain observational data, we may ascend, via an interpretive string, to some point in the theoretical network, thence proceed, via definitions and hypotheses, to other points, from which another interpretive string permits a descent to the plane of observation.

Michael Polanyi made an analogy between a theory and a map:

A theory is something other than myself. It may be set out on paper as a system of rules, and it is the more truly a theory the more completely it can be put down in such terms. Mathematical theory reaches the highest perfection in this respect. But even a geographical map fully embodies in itself a set of strict rules for finding one's way through a region of otherwise uncharted experience. Indeed, all theory may be regarded as a kind of map extended over space and time.

A scientific theory can also be thought of as a book that captures the fundamental information about the world, a book that must be researched, written, and shared. In 1623, Galileo Galilei wrote:

Philosophy [i.e. physics] is written in this grand book—I mean the universe—which stands continually open to our gaze, but it cannot be understood unless one first learns to comprehend the language and interpret the characters in which it is written. It is written in the language of mathematics, and its characters are triangles, circles, and other geometrical figures, without which it is humanly impossible to understand a single word of it; without these, one is wandering around in a dark labyrinth.

The book metaphor could also be applied in the following passage, by the contemporary philosopher of science Ian Hacking:

I myself prefer an Argentine fantasy. God did not write a Book of Nature of the sort that the old Europeans imagined. He wrote a Borgesian library, each book of which is as brief as possible, yet each book of which is inconsistent with every other. No book is redundant. For every book there is some humanly accessible bit of Nature such that that book, and no other, makes possible the comprehension, prediction and influencing of what is going on...Leibniz said that God chose a world which maximized the variety of phenomena while choosing the simplest laws. Exactly so: but the best way to maximize phenomena and have simplest laws is to have the laws inconsistent with each other, each applying to this or that but none applying to all.

== In physics ==
In physics, the term theory is generally used for a mathematical framework—derived from a small set of basic postulates (usually symmetries—like equality of locations in space or in time, or identity of electrons, etc.)—that is capable of producing experimental predictions for a given category of physical systems. A good example is classical electromagnetism, which encompasses results derived from gauge symmetry (sometimes called gauge invariance) in a form of a few equations called Maxwell's equations. The specific mathematical aspects of classical electromagnetic theory are termed "laws of electromagnetism", reflecting the level of consistent and reproducible evidence that supports them. Within electromagnetic theory generally, there are numerous hypotheses about how electromagnetism applies to specific situations. Many of these hypotheses are already considered to be adequately tested, with new ones always in the making and perhaps untested. An example of the latter might be the radiation reaction force. As of 2009, its effects on the periodic motion of charges are detectable in synchrotrons, but only as averaged effects over time. Some researchers are now considering experiments that could observe these effects at the instantaneous level (i.e. not averaged over time).

== Examples ==
Note that many fields of inquiry do not have specific named theories, e.g. developmental biology. Scientific knowledge outside a named theory can still have a high level of certainty, depending on the amount of evidence supporting it. Also note that since theories draw evidence from many fields, the categorization is not absolute.

- Biology: cell theory, theory of evolution (modern evolutionary synthesis), abiogenesis, germ theory, particulate inheritance theory, dual inheritance theory, Young–Helmholtz theory, opponent process, cohesion-tension theory
- Chemistry: collision theory, kinetic theory of gases, Lewis theory, molecular theory, molecular orbital theory, transition state theory, valence bond theory
- Physics: atomic theory, Big Bang theory, Dynamo theory, perturbation theory, theory of relativity (successor to classical mechanics), quantum field theory
- Earth science: Climate change theory (from climatology), plate tectonics theory (from geology), theories of the origin of the Moon, theories for the Moon illusion
- Astronomy: Stellar evolution, solar nebular model, stellar nucleosynthesis
