= Received view of theories =

Meta-scientific perspective

The received view of theories is a position in the philosophy of science that identifies a scientific theory with a set of propositions which are considered to be linguistic objects, such as axioms. Frederick Suppe describes the position of the received view by saying that it identifies scientific theories with "axiomatic calculi in which theoretical terms are given a partial observation interpretation by mean of correspondence rules." The received view is generally associated with the logical empiricists.

Recently, the received view of theories has been displaced by the semantic view of theories as the dominant position in theory formulation in the philosophy of science.
