= Mindset =

Term in decision theory and general systems theory

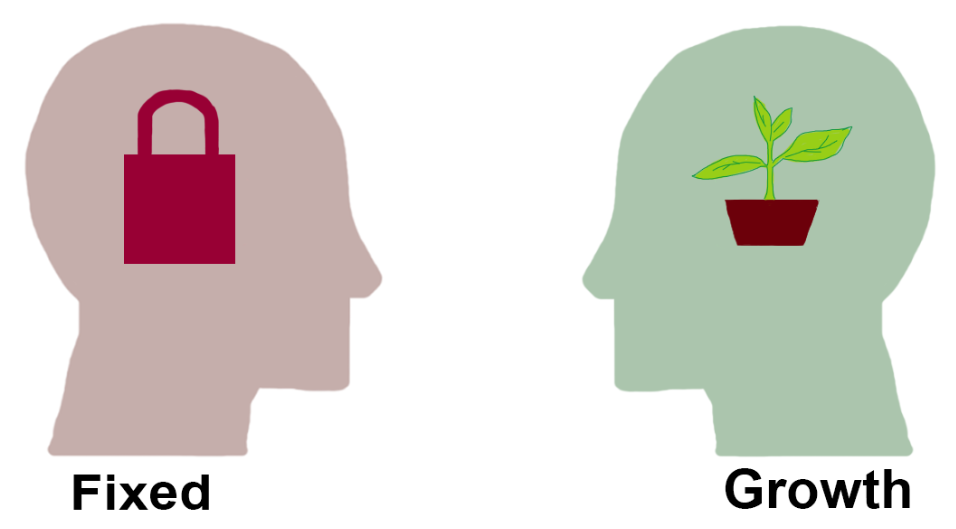
A well-known example of opposite mindsets

A mindset (also known as mentality especially when considered as biased and closed-minded) refers to an established set of attitudes of a person or group concerning culture, values, philosophy, frame of reference, outlook, or disposition. Person A is said to have a theory of mind (ToM) about person B, relating mindset research to ToM. This may also develop from a person's worldview or beliefs about the meaning of life.

A mindset could create an incentive to adopt (or accept) previous behaviors, choices, or tools, sometimes known as cognitive inertia or groupthink. When a prevailing mindset is limiting or inappropriate, it may be difficult to counteract its grip on analysis and decision-making.

In cognitive psychology, mindset is the cognitive process activated in a task. In addition to the field of cognitive psychology, the study of mindset is evident in the social sciences and other fields (such as positive psychology). Characteristic of this area of study is its fragmentation among academic disciplines.

== History ==
Numerous scholars have identified mindset history as being a critical gap in contemporary literature and also in current approaches to mindset education and training.

== Research ==
Mindset research is an interdisciplinary field of inquiry. Some of the earliest studies to explicitly include mindset as an area of focus were conducted in the 1910s and 1920s, primarily within a psychology and education context. This includes studies by scholars including Thaddeus Lincoln Bolton (1909), Edward Kellogg Strong and Margaret Hart Strong (1913), Edward Lee Thorndike (1913), Alexander James Inglis (1918), William Heard Kilpatrick (1921), and more.

Between the 1980s and 2000s, mindset research and its applications began to expand into other areas, including Glen Fisher's (1988) studies in international relations, Ellen Langer's (1989) research on mindfulness, Peter Gollwitzer's (1989) psychology of action phases, Donella Meadows' (1991) theory of systems change, Stephen Rhinesmith's (1992) work on global mindsets, Ronald Heifetz's (1994) practice of adaptive leadership, Carol Dweck's (2006) concept of implicit theories, and Robert Kegan's and Lisa Lahey's (2009) theory of adult development.

== Politics ==
A political example is the "Cold War mindset" in the U.S. and the USSR. This mindset reflects how people globally perceived the levels of security between the two nations. This mindset suggested that if one nation grew in strength and power, the other was threatened and vice versa. The main goal of the Cold War Mindset was to strengthen one's own nation's military and alliances while keeping the other nation's power limited. Also included in this mindset is the belief in game theory, in a chain of command in control of nuclear materials, and in the mutual assured destruction of both in a nuclear war. This mindset prevented an attack by either country, but deterrence theory has made assessments of the Cold War mindset a subject of controversy.

Modern military theory attempts to challenge entrenched mindsets in asymmetric warfare, terrorism, and the proliferation of weapons of mass destruction. These threats are "a revolution in military affairs", requiring rapid adaptation to new threats and circumstances.

== Systems theory ==
Building on Magoroh Maruyama's concept of mindscape, mindset includes a cultural and social orientation: hierarchical and egalitarian individualism, hierarchical and egalitarian collectivism, hierarchic and egalitarian synergism, and hierarchical and egalitarian populism.

== Collective mindset ==
Collective mindsets are described in Edwin Hutchins's Cognition in the Wild (1995) and Maximilian Senges' Knowledge Entrepreneurship in Universities (2007). Hutchins analyzed a team of naval navigators as a cognitive unit or computational system, and Senges explained how a collective mindset is part of university strategy and practice.

Erik H. Erikson's analysis of group-identities and what he calls a "life-plan" is relevant to a collective mindset. Erikson cites Native Americans who were meant to undergo a reeducation process to instill a modern "life-plan" which advocated housing and wealth; the natives' collective historic identity as buffalo hunters was oriented around such fundamentally different motivations that communication about life plans was difficult.

An institution is related to collective mindset; an entrepreneurial mindset refers to a person who "values uncertainty in the marketplace and seeks to continuously identify opportunities with the potential to lead to important innovations". An institution with an entrepreneurial philosophy will have entrepreneurial goals and strategies. It fosters an entrepreneurial milieu, allowing each entity to pursue emerging opportunities. A collective mindset fosters values which lead to a particular practice. Hitt cites the five dimensions of an entrepreneurial mindset as "autonomy, innovativeness, risk taking, proactiveness, and competitive aggressiveness".

== Theories ==
The study of mindsets includes definition, measurement, and categorization. Scholars in the same discipline differ.

=== Mindset agency ===
Sagiv and Schwarts defined cultural values to explain the nature, functions, and variables which characterize mindset agency. They posited three bipolar dimensions of culture, based on values: cognitive (embedded or autonomous), figurative (mastery or harmony), and operative (hierarchical or egalitarian).

=== Mindscape theory ===
The Myers–Briggs Type Indicator (MBTI) measures psychological functions which, paired with social attitudes, combine to generate personality types that may be evaluated by exploring individual preferences. Maruyama's mindscape theory measures individuals on a scale of characteristics and places them into one of four personality categories.

=== Fixed and growth mindsets ===
According to Carol Dweck, individuals can be placed on a continuum according to their views about where ability originates, from a fixed to a growth mindset. An individual's mindset affects the "motivation to practice and learn".

People with a fixed mindset believe that "intelligence is static", and little can be done to improve ability. Feedback is seen as "evaluation of their underlying ability" and success is seen as a result of this ability, not any effort expended. Failure is intimidating, since it "suggests constraints or limits they would not be able to overcome". Those with a fixed mindset tend to avoid challenges, give up easily, and focus on the outcome. They believe that their abilities are fixed, and effort has little value.

Those with a growth mindset believe that "intelligence can be developed", and their abilities can be increased by learning. They tend to embrace challenges, persevere in the face of adversity, accept and learn from failure, focus on process rather than outcome, and see abilities as skills which are developed through effort. Feedback and failure are seen as opportunities to increase ability, signaling the "need to pay attention, invest effort, apply time to practice, and master the new learning opportunity".

Grit, a personality trait combining determination and perseverance, is related to a growth mindset. Keown and Bourke discussed the importance of a growth mindset and grit. Their 2019 study found that people with lower economic status had a greater chance of success if they had a growth mindset and were willing to work through tribulation.

Much of Dweck's research was related to the effect of a student's mindset on classroom performance. For students to develop a growth mindset, a nurturing classroom culture must be established with appropriate praise and encouragement. According to Dweck, "Praising students for the process they have engaged in—the effort they applied, the strategies they used, the choices they made, the persistence they displayed, and so on—yields more long-term benefits than telling them they are 'smart' when they succeed". Teachers need to design meaningful learning activities for their students: "The teacher should portray challenges as fun and exciting, while portraying easy tasks as boring and less useful for the brain".

A second strategy to promote a growth mindset in the classroom is more explicit, establishing personal goals, and having students "write about and share with one another something they used to be poor at and now are very good at." Hinda Hussein studied the positive effect of reflective journal writing on students' growth mindset; journaling can improve a student's conceptual knowledge and enhance the understanding of their thoughts. Dweck has identified the word "yet" as a valuable tool to assess learning. If a teacher hears students saying that they are not good at something or cannot do something, they should interject "not yet" to reinforce the idea that ability and motivation are fluid.

Dweck and Jo Boaler indicate a fixed mindset can lead to sex differences in education, which can partially explain low achievement and participation by minority and female students. Boaler builds on Dweck's research to show that "gender differences in mathematics performance only existed among fixed mindset students". Boaler and Dweck say that people with growth mindsets can gain knowledge. Boaler said, "The key growth mindset message was that effort changes the brain by forming new connections, and that students control this process. The growth mindset intervention halted the students' decline in grades and started the students on a new pathway of improvement and high achievement".

L. S. Blackwell presented research in 2015 exploring whether growth mindsets can be promoted in minority groups. Blackwell builds on Dweck's research, observing minority groups and finding that "students with a growth mindset had stronger learning goals than the fixed mindset students." These students "had much more positive attitudes toward effort, agreeing that 'when something is hard, it just makes me want to work more on it, not less'". Students with a fixed mindset were more likely to say that "if you're not good at a subject, working hard won't make you good at it" and "when I work hard at something, it makes me feel like I'm not very smart".

Dweck's research on growth and fixed mindsets is useful in intervening with at-risk students, dispelling negative stereotypes in education held by teachers and students, understanding the impacts of self-theories on resilience, and understanding how praise can foster a growth mindset and positively impact student motivation. There has also been movement towards the application of Dweck's mindset research in non-academic environments, such as the workplace. Other scholars have conducted research building on her findings. A 2018 study by Rhew et al. suggested that a growth-mindset intervention can increase the motivation of adolescent special-education participants. A 2019 study by Wang et al. suggested that substance use has adverse effects on adolescent reasoning. Developing a growth mindset in these adolescents was shown to reduce this adverse effect. These studies illustrate how educators can intervene, encouraging a growth mindset, by allowing students to see that their behavior can be changed with effort. Criticism has been directed at "growth mindset" and related research, however. Moreau et al. (2019) suggest "that overemphasizing the malleability of abilities and other traits can have negative consequences for individuals, science, and society." In 2019 a larger randomized controlled trial by the Education Endowment Foundation for growth mindset training showed no significant increase in numeracy or literacy. A 2024 study showed that growth mindset scales by Carol Dweck have psychometric comparability, however this study showed no connection between growth mindset and goal achievement.

Follow up research after the release of her book led Dweck to be quoted as saying "Nobody has a growth mindset in everything all the time." along with the acknowledgement of the reality of the false growth mindset, and the truer growth mindset. One of Dweck's concerns was that educators were giving praise based on effort alone, when the results gained did not merit praise. Researchers noted adults within a study "who agree with growth mindset, but do not behave as though they believe ability can change" as holding a false growth mindset.

=== Students and teachers ===
Elements of personality (such as sensitivity to mistakes and setbacks) may predispose toward a particular mindset, which can be developed and reshaped through interactions. In a number of studies, Dweck and her colleagues noted that alterations in mindset could be achieved through "praising the process through which success was achieved", "having [college aged students] read compelling scientific articles that support one view or the other", or teaching junior-high-school students "that every time they try hard and learn something new, their brain forms new connections that, over time, make them smarter."

Much research in education focuses on a student's ability to adopt a growth mindset, and less attention is paid to teachers' mindsets and their influence on students. Hattie writes, "Differing mindsets, or assumptions, that teachers possess about themselves and their students play a significant role in determining their expectations, teaching practices, and how students perceive their own mindset."

A study by Patrick and Joshi explored how teachers explain growth and fixed mindsets, with two major findings in 150 semi-structured interviews. First, they found that teachers' prior beliefs about learning and students influenced how they engaged with their mindsets. Second, they found that many teachers oversimplified growth and fixed mindsets as positive and negative traits.

A study conducted by Fiona S. Seaton (2018) examined the impact of teacher training to influence mindset. The teachers in this study had six training sessions, and Seaton found that the sessions had an impact on their mindsets which was sustained three months afterward. The results of this study suggest that adult mindsets are malleable, and can shift with appropriate supports.

=== Benefit mindset ===
In 2015, Ash Buchanan and Margaret L. Kern proposed a benefit mindset: an evolution of the fixed and growth mindsets.

=== Global mindset ===
Originating from the study of organizational leadership and coinciding with the growth of multinational corporations during the 1980s, organizations observed that executive effectiveness did not necessarily translate cross-culturally. A global mindset emerged as an explanation. Cross-cultural leaders were hypothesized to need an additional skill, ability, or proficiency (a global mindset) to be effective regardless of culture or context. Cultural agility refers to such a need. A defining characteristic of the study of global mindset is the variety with which scholars define it, but they typically agree that global mindset and its development increase global effectiveness for individuals and organizations. For instance, a study of Chinese SMEs found that managers with a strong global mindset tended to favour shared-control or integrated export channels, providing a concrete example of the importance of global mindset in business.

=== Abundance and scarcity ===
People with an abundance mindset believe that there are enough resources for everyone, and see the glass as half-full; those with a scarcity mindset believe that there is a limited number of resources, and see the glass as half-empty. Mehta and Zhu found that an "abundance mindset makes people think beyond established functionalities to explore broadly for solutions, thereby heightening creativity. In contrast, a scarcity mindset induces functional fixedness, thereby reducing creativity."

=== Productive and defensive mindsets ===
According to Chris Argyris, organizations have two dominant mindsets: productive and defensive. The productive mindset is hinged in logic, focused on knowledge and its certifiable results – a decision-making mindset which is transparent and auditable.

The defensive mindset is closed, self-protective and self-deceptive. It does not see the greater good, but centers on individual defense; truth, if perceived as harmful to the person concerned, would be denied. This may allow personal growth, but no organizational growth or development.

=== Deliberative and implemental mindsets ===
The deliberative and implemental mindsets are part of the decision making process in goal setting and goal striving. When someone has a deliberative mindset, they are considering a variety of actions and have not yet settled on what they are going to do. This person will tend to be open to alternative options when presented and will explore ideas until they have decided upon a course of action. This mindset is connected to the idea of goal setting.

After someone narrows down their options and makes a commitment to follow a particular path, they will have an implemental mindset. People with an implemental mindset are less open to alternative courses of action because they have already decided what they are going to do and now focus more energy on goal striving, rather than goal setting.

The deliberative mindset has been recognized as important for coming to conclusions in order to make a well-planned goal, but it has negative consequences for goal striving once a goal is already in place. On the other hand, the implemental mindset helps people to focus their behavior in a particular direction; this can be detrimental for someone who has not spent sufficient time with a deliberative mindset.

=== Promotion and prevention mindsets ===
The promotion and prevention mindsets are motivational orientations that are focused on the outcomes or consequences of behavior. People with a promotion mindset focus on achievement and accomplishment. Those with a prevention mindset pay closer attention to avoiding negative outcomes. They act more out of a sense of obligation and the fulfillment of duty than to seek any sort of reward. Both of these mindsets can be caused or influenced by individual disposition or by environmental stimuli. Those who are dispositional in a promotion mindset seek to make good things happen, and situations that encourage a promotion mindset are those in which there is a promise of gain. Those with a dispositional prevention mindset believe that they need to keep bad things from happening, and situations conducive to the prevention mindset are those in which the idea of duty is emphasized.

Those with a promotion mindset are characterized as being eager and quick to act. They take initiative and move to cause improvements towards their ideal state. People with a prevention mindset are characterized as being cautious and careful, avoiding risks and any course of action that could potentially cause failure in reaching a goal.

== See also ==
- Attitude
- Autonomous agency theory
- Basic belief
- Belief § Belief systems
- Einstellung effect
- Entrepreneurship
- Implicit theories of intelligence
- Intentionality
- Mental model
- Mental representation
- Paradigm
- Philosophy of life
- Propositional attitude
- Schema (psychology)
- Set (psychology)
- The Scout Mindset
- Viable system theory
- Victim mentality
- Worldview
