= Implicit theories of intelligence =

Concepts in social and developmental psychology

In social and developmental psychology, an individual's implicit theory of intelligence refers to his or her fundamental underlying beliefs regarding whether or not intelligence or abilities can change, developed by Carol Dweck and colleagues.

== History ==
Ellen Leggett introduce implicit theories of intelligence in 1985. Her paper "Children's entity and incremental theories of intelligence: Relationships to achievement behavior" was presented at the 1985 meeting of the Eastern Psychological Association in Boston. As a result, Dweck and her collaborators began studying how individuals unknowingly (or implicitly) assess their own intelligence and abilities through interaction and interpretation of their environment. It was assumed that these assessments ultimately influenced the individual's goals, motivations, behaviors, and self-esteem. The proposed theories was made to explain how individuals view and response to learning process and achievement relates to the motivational framework. The researchers began by looking at students who were highly motivated to achieve, and students who were not, though the levels of self-achievement were not clarified. They noticed that the highly motivated students thrived in the face of challenge while the other students quit or withdrew from their work, but critically, a student's raw intelligence did not predict whether a student was highly motivated or not. Rather, they discovered that these two groups of students held different beliefs (or implicit theories) about intelligence, categorized as entity or incremental theories, which affected their classroom performance.

== Entity theory vs. incremental theory ==
Carol Dweck identified two different mindsets regarding intelligence beliefs. The entity theory of intelligence refers to an individual's belief that abilities are fixed traits. For entity theorists, if perceived ability to perform a task is high, the perceived possibility for mastery is also high. In turn, if perceived ability is low, there is little perceived possibility of mastery, often regarded as an outlook of "learned helplessness". However, the incremental theory of intelligence proposes that intelligence and ability are malleable traits which can be improved upon through effort and hard work. For incremental theorists, there is a perceived possibility of mastery even when initial ability to perform a task is low. Those who subscribe to this theory of intelligence "don't necessarily believe that anyone can become an Einstein or Mozart, but they do understand even Einstein and Mozart had to put in years of effort to become who they were". This possibility of mastery contributes in part to intrinsic motivation of individuals to perform a task, since there is perceived potential for success in the task.

Individuals may fall on some spectrum between the two types of theories, and their views may change given different situations and training. By observing an individual's motivation and behavior towards achievement, an individual's general mindset regarding intelligence is revealed. About 40% of the general population believe the entity theory, 40% believe the incremental theory, and 20% do not fit well into either category.

Performance level on a task is not always predetermined by an individual's mindset. Previous research on the subject has shown that when faced with failure on an initial task, those with an entity theory mindset will perform worse on subsequent tasks that measure the same ability than those with an incremental theory mindset. However, when the subsequent task measured a different ability, entity theorists performed better than incremental theorists. In certain situations, the incremental theorists' were self-critical about the previous failure; these thoughts disrupted their performance on the subsequent task. Incremental theorists' reactions to failure are traditionally seen as an "adaptive response", meaning they link the failure to insufficient effort and therefore search for ways to improve their performance. If there is no opportunity for improvement on the task, such as in the research study, thoughts of doubt about the failure affect future performance.

For the individuals who believed in an entity theory of intelligence, there were no such feelings of doubt when performing the second task because they perceived the task as not measuring the ability that they lacked on the initial task. After the first failure, self-critical thoughts are less likely to linger in their minds while performing the second task; the study points out that "entity theorists will not necessarily feel helpless because the second task does not measure the ability they think they lack". Therefore, in this study, entity theorists performed better on the subsequent task than did incremental theorists if the measured ability was different.

Furthermore, socialization plays a role in shaping students implicit view of their intelligence which can impact their academic performance, meaning that implicit theory of intelligence also vary across culture. In a recent study there is support on the association between students belief about intelligence and their academic performance using the Dweck's scale of intelligence. Student who have the belief of intelligence as incremental theorists show higher grades in specific subjects (verbal and quantitative subjects) and in overall achievements. Meanwhile, students who have the belief of intelligence as entity theorist also showed higher grades in specific subjects but the effect was weaker. The study highlight that there is also cross-cultural differences association on how people belief of intelligence based on entity theory and incremental theory. Students from Eastern continents (Asia and Oceania) show a positive association between incremental theory beliefs and achievement; this means that collectivistic society emphasize students value the process of learning more than individual academic achievement and results. Meanwhile, European students displayed a positive association between entity theory beliefs and achievement; this means that in individualistic society there is more priority to individual academic achievement and results over the learning process. This study show that there is an important role of cultural differences that can be taken into account while talking about the implicit theory of intelligence.

== Motivation toward achievement ==
=== Different types of goals ===
An individual's motivation towards achievement is shaped by their implicit theory of intelligence (and their related implicit theories about domain-specific aptitudes) and its associated goals. J.G. Nicholls proposed two different types of goals related to achievement. Task involvement goals involve individuals aiming to improve their own abilities. Ego involvement goals involve individuals wanting to better themselves compared to others. Dweck modified Nicholls' ideas by proposing performance goals and mastery goals. Performance goals are associated with entity theory and lead individuals to perform actions in order to appear capable and avoid negative judgments about their skills. Mastery goals are associated with incremental theory and lead individuals to engage and work in order to gain expertise in new things.

=== Response to challenge ===
Individuals who believe they have the ability to grow and add to their knowledge gladly accept challenges that can aid in growth towards mastery. Individuals who believe their abilities are fixed will also accept and persist through challenges as long as they feel they will succeed and their abilities will not be questioned. However, when these individuals lack confidence in their abilities, they will avoid, procrastinate, or possibly cheat in challenging situations that might make them appear incompetent. These behaviors can lead to a sense of learned helplessness and stymied intellectual growth.

Research also suggests that the theories of intelligence are predictors of one's affective states when responding to challenges. Individuals with an incremental theory mindset are associated with positive emotions such as hope, pride, and enjoyment, which encourage persistence and direct engagement with challenges. Whereas individuals with an entity mindset are associated with negative emotions such as anger, shame, anxiety, likely leading to demotivation and avoidance behaviors.

=== Attribution of failure ===
Attribution of failure and coping with that failure are highly related to mindset. Individuals who subscribe to an incremental view will attribute a failure to not yet having learned something, looking at something from the incorrect perspective, or not working hard enough. All of these problems can be corrected through effort, leading incrementalist individuals to continually seek any situation that will intellectually better themselves. Also they are more likely to engage in remedial action to correct mistakes if necessary. Those with fixed intelligence views attribute failure to their own lack of ability.

=== Self-regulation vs. Self-Handicapping ===
Individuals with an incremental mindset will take feedback and channel that into determination to try new strategies for solving a given problem, a large part of self-regulated learning (or learning to effectively guide your own studies). As a result, incrementalist individuals are more effective at self-regulated learning, ultimately leading them to be more productive at developing plans for learning and making connections between topics which promotes deeper processing of information.

In addition to self-regulated learning, there is a strong positive correlation between incremental theory and behavioral self-regulation indicated by organizational behaviors such as planning and task completion, along with an association with positive affect. In contrast, individuals with entity theory mindsets had significant correlation with negative affect and self-handicapping behavior such as making excuses or procrastinating.

== Self-esteem ==
Incrementalist individuals generally have positive and stable self-esteem, and are less likely to question their intelligence when faced with failure. Individuals with entity beliefs mostly attribute failure or having to exert effort to a lack of ability. Individuals with entity beliefs tend to attribute failure or exertion of effort to a lack of ability. Therefore, if an individual with entity beliefs does not succeed at some task, they are unlikely to seek similar tasks and may stop trying to solve the current task. They believe that putting in effort will undermine their competence because if they were smart enough to begin with, they would not need to put in effort. These individuals believe that exertion will undermine their competence as they tend to equate effort with a lack of intelligence. As such, these individuals tend to put themselves in situations where they believe they will succeed and may limit themselves in the face of negative feedback, as they are more likely to believe this feedback to be a direct attack on their ability. These individuals' self-esteem and enjoyment of a task may suffer when encountering failure and the associated feelings of helplessness.

Many children who see failure as a reflection of their intelligence will lie about their scores to preserve their self-esteem and competence, since their self-concept is largely tied to their performance. Other ways of preserving self-esteem include mentioning expertise in other domains, or in some cases boasting about their wealth or possessions. Incrementalists, who place a greater value on effort, do not show such a tendency, instead viewing difficult problems as an opportunity for mastery. In an academic setting, many students who achieve a great deal of academic success early on may be more likely to develop an entity mindset because they so frequently have been praised regarding their intelligence. Additionally, these students may have faced fewer setbacks and lack experience persisting through errors. Longitudinal research shows that individuals who endorse entity beliefs tend to experience decreasing self-esteem throughout their college years, while individuals who endorse incremental beliefs tend to experience an increase.

== Development ==
Implicit theories of intelligence develop at an early age and are subtly influenced by parents and educators and the type of praise they give for successful work. Typically it has been assumed that any type of praise will have a positive impact on a child's self-confidence and achievement. However, different types of praise can lead to the development of different views on intelligence including "person praise" and "process praise". Studies have shown that parents' type of praise to their children between the ages of 14 and 38 months was significant a predictor of the child's implicit theory of intelligence at age 7 to 8 years, even when the parent-child interactions were only measured and observed in 4.5 hours of interaction. Young children who hear "person praise" that values high intelligence as a measure of success may link failure with a lack of intelligence and are more likely to develop an entity mindset. Often, children are given high "person praise" for their intelligence after relatively easy success. This sets them up to develop counterproductive behaviors in dealing with setbacks in this domain, rather than fostering confidence and the enjoyment of learning. "Process praise" for intelligence connects performance with ability, rather than effort, leading these individuals to develop "performance" goals to prove competence. However, students who receive praise valuing hard work as a measure of success more often pursue mastery goals more characteristic of an incremental mindset. Furthermore, subtle differences in speech to children that promote non-generic praise (i.e. "You did a good job drawing") versus generic praise (i.e. "You are a good drawer"), lead children to respond to later criticism in a way that demonstrates an incremental mindset. Therefore, parent use of process praise can influence children's later motivational frameworks of implicit theories of intelligence.

Early on, children tend to subscribe to an incremental theory. This is consistent with findings that in general, children and adolescents tend to view traits as more flexible than adults. However, as children grow, their implicit theories can shift as they receive more fixed-mindset reinforcement. For example, it is thought that lack of challenge in school encourages an entity mindset, since hard work is not necessary nor rewarded. This lack of challenge also results in ability-based praise, further reinforcing the entity mindset.

== Shifting from entity to incremental mindset to improve achievement ==
Understanding differences between those who believe in entity theory versus incremental theory allows educators to predict how students will persevere in a classroom. Then, educators can change behaviors that may contribute to academic shortcomings for those with entity tendencies and low confidence in their abilities. While these implicit beliefs regarding where intelligence comes from are relatively stable across time and permeate all aspects of behavior, it is possible to change peoples' perspectives on their abilities for a given task with the right priming. Dweck's 2006 book Mindset: How You Can Fill Your Potential focuses on teaching individuals how they can encourage thinking with a growth mindset for a happier and more successful existence.

=== Elementary-aged students ===
Given the opportunity for fifth graders to choose their own learning tasks, when primed towards gaining skills, they will pick challenging tasks. When they are primed towards assessment, they will pick tasks that they think they will be successful at to show off their abilities. Thus, they will forgo new learning if it means the possibility of making mistakes. If the situation is framed in a manner that emphasizes learning and process rather than success, mindset can be altered.

=== Middle school-aged children ===
Transitioning between elementary school and middle school is a time when many students with an entity theory of intelligence begin to experience their first taste of academic difficulty. Transitioning students with low abilities can be oriented to a growth mentality when taught that their brains are like muscles that get stronger through hard work and effort. This lesson can result in a marked improvement in grades compared to students with similar abilities and resources available to them who do not receive this information on the brain.

=== College-aged students ===
One consequence for individuals experiencing the stereotype threat (or worrying about conforming to a negative stereotype associated with a member of one's group) is that they will also experience an entity mindset. College students are able to overcome this negative impact after participating in an incremental thinking intervention, afterwards reporting higher levels of happiness according to the theory.

== Predictive power of knowing an individual's theory ==
=== Success in school and on tests ===
An individual's implicit theory of intelligence can predict future success, particularly navigating life transitions that are often associated with challenging situations, such as moving from elementary to middle school. Students followed throughout their middle school careers showed that those who possessed growth mindset tendencies made better grades and had a more positive view on the role of effort than students who possessed fixed mindset tendencies with similar abilities, two years following the initial survey. Those with theoretical entity beliefs worry more about tests even in situations where they have experienced some success, spend less time practicing before tests, and thus have shown reduced performance on IQ tests relative to others in their environment. If the situation is framed in a manner that emphasizes learning and process rather than success, mindset can be altered. Individuals with fixed mindsets may engage in less practice in order to allow themselves an excuse besides low ability for potentially poor performance in order to preserve their egos. Students who have learning goals (associated with incremental beliefs) are more internally motivated and successful in the face of a challenging college course. After the first test in a course, those who possess learning goals are likely to improve their grades on the next test whereas those with performance goals did not.

=== Negotiation skills ===
Incrementalist individuals tend to have stronger negotiating skills, believing that with effort a better deal can be reached. This finding may have implications for more favorable working conditions for those with incrementalist beliefs.

=== "Easily learned = easily remembered" heuristic ===
According to theory, individuals who believe their intelligence can grow think about information in their world differently even outside of academic challenges, seen by use of a different heuristic when making judgments of learning (JOLs), or estimates of learning. Those with entity views are generally guided by the principle "easily learned" means "easily remembered," which means that when learning information, these individuals will make low JOLs when a task is difficult. Those with incremental views did not follow this "easily learned" means "easily remembered" principle and gave higher judgments to more difficult tasks, perhaps believing that if more effort is put into the learning because it is harder, those items will be better remembered.

== Other behaviors governed by implicit theories ==
Research into implicit theories of intelligence has led to additional discoveries expanding the idea of entity vs incremental mindset to other areas outside of just intelligence. Views about intelligence are just a single manifestation of a more general entity or incremental mindset which reveals a great deal about a person's view of the world and self. Generally those with entity views will see all characteristics, in addition to intelligence, as innate and static while those with incremental views see characteristics as malleable. Entity beliefs lead to more stereotyping, greater rigidity in prejudiced beliefs, and difficulties during conflict resolution. Incremental views are connected to more open beliefs and amenability during conflict resolutions. In intimate relationships, those who possess an incremental mindset tend to believe that people can change and exhibit more forgiveness than those with entity mindsets. Similarly, those with entity beliefs are likely to endorse the fundamental attribution error more than those with incremental views, who tend to focus much more on the situation than internal characteristics of an individual.

== See also ==
- Goal orientation
- Mindset
- Intelligence
