= Carol Dweck =

American psychologist (born 1946)

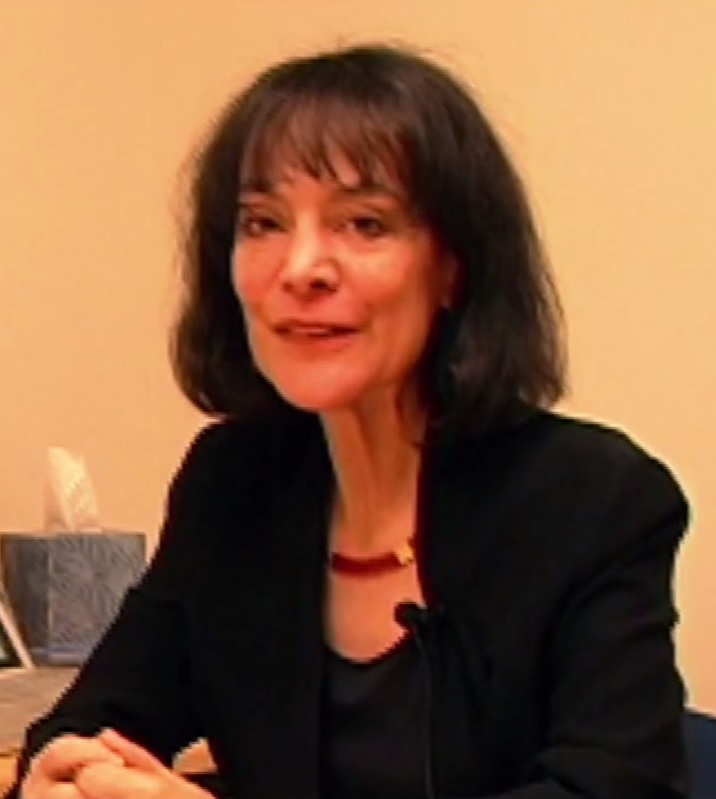
- Carol Dweck speaking for the documentary Innovation: Where Creativity and Technology Meet in 2015
- Born: Carol Susan Dweck; October 17, 1946 (age 79)
- Education: Barnard College; Yale University (PhD)
- Awards: E. L. Thorndike Award (2009); Member of the National Academy of Sciences (2012); James McKeen Cattell Fellow Award (2013); Yidan Prize for Education Research (2017)
- Scientific career
- Fields: Social psychology Developmental psychology
- Workplaces: Stanford University; Columbia University; Harvard University; University of Illinois
- Thesis: The Role of Expectations and Attributions in the Alleviation of Learned Helplessness in a Problem-Solving Situation (1972)

Carol Susan Dweck (born October 17, 1946) is an American psychologist. She holds the Lewis and Virginia Eaton Professorship of Psychology at Stanford University. Dweck is known for her work on motivation and mindset. She was on the faculty at the University of Illinois, Harvard, and Columbia before joining the Stanford University faculty in 2004. She was named an Association for Psychological Science (APS) James McKeen Cattell Fellow in 2013, an APS Mentor Awardee in 2019, and an APS William James Fellow in 2020, and has been a member of the National Academy of Sciences since 2012.

== Early life and education ==
Dweck was born in New York. Her father worked in the export-import business and her mother in advertising. She was the only daughter and the middle sibling of three children.

In her sixth grade class at the P.S. 153 elementary school in Brooklyn, New York, students were seated in order of their IQ; some responsibilities like erasing the blackboard and carrying the flag were reserved to students with the highest IQs. She later described becoming "increasingly afraid to risk her reputation as one of the most intelligent children in the class", by avoiding participation in a spelling bee and a French competition.

She graduated from Barnard College in 1967, and earned a Ph.D. in psychology from Yale University in 1972.

== Career and research ==
After obtaining her PhD, Dweck joined the faculty of the University of Illinois, eventually reaching the rank of associate professor. In 1981, she became a professor at Harvard's Laboratory of Human Development, then returned to the University of Illinois in 1985. In 1989, she joined the faculty of Columbia University, and in 2004 became a Lewis and Virginia Eaton professor of psychology at Stanford University.

Dweck's research focuses on mindset and motivation.

=== Mindset work ===
Dweck's key contribution to social psychology relates to the concept of implicit theories of intelligence and personality, which she first introduced in a 1988 paper. In the academic literature, the term "implicit theories" is often treated as synonymous with "implicit beliefs", "self-theories", or "mindsets", and is defined by Dweck as "core assumptions about the malleability of personal attributes". Dweck later popularized the concept in her 2006 non-academic book Mindset: The New Psychology of Success.

According to Dweck, individuals can be placed on a continuum according to their implicit views of where ability comes from; those believing their success to be based on innate ability are said to have a "fixed" theory of intelligence (fixed mindset), and those believing their success is based on hard work, learning, training and doggedness are said to have a "growth" or an "incremental" theory of intelligence (growth mindset). In 2012, Dweck defined fixed and growth mindsets, in interview, in this way:

In a fixed mindset students believe their basic abilities, their intelligence, their talents, are just fixed traits. They have a certain amount and that's that, and then their goal becomes to look smart all the time and never look dumb. In a growth mindset students understand that their talents and abilities can be developed through effort, good teaching and persistence. They don't necessarily think everyone's the same or anyone can be Einstein, but they believe everyone can get smarter if they work at it.

According to Dweck, individuals may not necessarily be aware of their own mindset, but their mindset can still be discerned based on their behavior, being especially evident in their reaction to failure. Dweck has described fixed-mindset individuals as dreading failure because it is a negative statement on their basic abilities, while growth mindset individuals don't mind or fear failure as much because they realize their performance can be improved and learning comes from failure. According to Dweck, these two mindsets play an important role in all aspects of a person's life; she argues that the growth mindset allows a person to live a less stressful and more successful life.

As explained by Dweck, a growth mindset is not just about effort. Dweck has written that a common misunderstanding is that the growth mindset is "just about effort". She states, "The growth mindset was intended to help close achievement gaps, not hide them. It is about telling the truth about a student's current achievement and then, together, doing something about it, helping him or her become smarter."

Dweck warns of the dangers of praising intelligence as it puts children in a fixed mindset, and they will not want to be challenged because they will not want to look stupid or make a mistake. She notes, "Praising children's intelligence harms motivation and it harms performance." She advises, "If parents want to give their children a gift, the best thing they can do is to teach their children to love challenges, be intrigued by mistakes, enjoy effort, and keep on learning. That way, their children don't have to be slaves of praise. They will have a lifelong way to build and repair their own confidence."

=== Recent work ===
In 2017, she stated "I am now developing a broad theory that puts motivation and the formation of mindsets (or beliefs) at the heart of social and personality development." Later that year she published the theory in a paper titled "From Needs to Goals and Representations: Foundations for a Unified Theory of Motivation, Personality, and Development".

=== Criticism ===
Dweck's findings have been reported in journals such as Psychological Science and Nature, with research teams led by Dweck.

Some critics have said that Dweck's research can be difficult to replicate; for instance, a 2017 opinion piece by Toby Young, associate editor of The Spectator, states that:

Timothy Bates, a psychology professor at Edinburgh University, has been trying for several years to replicate Dweck’s findings, each time without success, and his colleagues haven’t been able to either. Dweck explains these failures by claiming the psychologists in question don’t create the right experimental environment — it’s too delicate a task for these ham-fisted troglodytes. But if professors of psychology can’t repeat the results, what hope do teachers surrounded by unruly children have?

Nick Brown, who co-developed the GRIM statistical test, argued in 2017: "If your effect is so fragile that it can only be reproduced [under strictly controlled conditions], then why do you think it can be reproduced by schoolteachers?" Brown points out that most of the research in this area has been conducted by Dweck or her collaborators. After Brown's application of the GRIM method showed that some of the means reported in the 1998 study were "impossible", he reviewed the original study data and found some errors in the recording of data, which Dweck publicly acknowledged. Brown praised Dweck's "openness and willingness to address the problems".

Other education and psychology researchers have expressed worry that "mindset" has simply become another aspect to be assessed and graded in children; Matt O'Leary, an education lecturer at Birmingham City University, tweeted that it was "farcical" that his six-year-old daughter was being graded on her attitude towards learning. David James, professor of social sciences at Cardiff University and editor of the British Journal of Sociology of Education, says "it's great to dwell on the fact that intelligence is not fundamentally genetic and unchangeable", but he believes the limitations of mindset outweigh its uses: "It individualizes the failure – 'they couldn't change the way they think, so that's why they failed'." James notes that a study in 2013 showed no statistically significant effect of mindset theory.

In July 2019, a large randomized controlled trial of growth mindset training by the Education Endowment Foundation in England, involved 101 schools and 5018 pupils across the country. After the trial they found that pupils in schools receiving the intervention showed no additional progress in literacy or numeracy relative to pupils in the control group. These findings were determined by the national Key Stage 2 tests in reading, grammar, punctuation, and spelling (GPS), and mathematics.

== Awards and recognition ==
Dweck was elected to the American Academy of Arts and Sciences in 2002, and received the Distinguished Scientific Contribution Award from the American Psychological Association (APA) in 2011. She was elected to the National Academy of Sciences in 2012. Dweck was named an Association for Psychological Science (APS) James McKeen Cattell Fellow in 2013. On September 19, 2017, the Hong Kong-based Yidan Prize Foundation named Dweck one of two inaugural laureates, to be awarded the Yidan Prize for Education Research, citing her mindset work. The prize includes receipt of approximately US$3.9 million, divided equally between a cash prize and project funding. Dweck received an APS Mentor Award in 2019, and was named an APS William James Fellow in 2020.

== Selected publications ==
=== Papers ===
- Dweck, Carol S.; Leggett, Ellen L. (April 1988). "A social-cognitive approach to motivation and personality". Psychological Review. 95 (2): 256–273. doi:10.1037/0033-295X.95.2.256. ISSN 1939-1471.
- Dweck, C. S.; Chiu, C. Y.; Hong, Y. Y. (1995). "Implicit Theories: Elaboration and Extension of the Model". Psychological Inquiry. 6 (4): 322–333. doi:10.1207/s15327965pli0604_12. hdl:10722/44537.
- Blackwell, Lisa S.; Trzesniewski, Kali H.; Dweck, Carol Sorich (February 2007). "Implicit Theories of Intelligence Predict Achievement Across an Adolescent Transition: A Longitudinal Study and an Intervention". Child Development. 78 (1): 246–263. doi:10.1111/j.1467-8624.2007.00995.x. ISSN 0009-3920. PMID 17328703.

=== Books ===
- Heckhausen, Jutta; Dweck, Carol S., eds. (1998). Motivation and Self-Regulation Across the Life Span. Cambridge, England: Cambridge University Press. ISBN 0521591767. OCLC 37801327.
- Dweck, Carol S. (2000). Self-theories: Their Role in Motivation, Personality, and Development. Philadelphia, PA: Taylor & Francis-Psychology Press. ISBN 1841690244. OCLC 44401375.
- Dweck, Carol S. (2006). Mindset: The New Psychology of Success. New York, NY: Random House. ISBN 1400062756. OCLC 58546262.
- Elliot, Andrew J.; Dweck, Carol S., eds. (2007). Handbook of Competence and Motivation (Pbk. ed.). New York, NY: Guilford Press. ISBN 9781593856069. OCLC 163810853.
- Dweck, Carol S. (2012). Mindset: How You Can Fulfill Your Potential. London, England: Constable & Robinson. ISBN 9781780332000. OCLC 757931861.

== Personal life ==
Dweck is married to David Goldman, who is a national theatre director and critic and the founder and director of the National Center for New Plays at Stanford University.
