= Semantic view of theories =

Meta-scientific perspective

The semantic view of theories is a position in the philosophy of science that holds that a scientific theory can be identified with a collection of models. The semantic view of theories was originally proposed by Patrick Suppes in “A Comparison of the Meaning and Uses of Models in Mathematics and the Empirical Sciences” as a reaction against the received view of theories popular among the logical positivists. Many varieties of the semantic view propose identifying theories with a class of set-theoretic models in the Tarskian sense, while others specify models in the mathematical language stipulated by the field of which the theory is a member.

== Semantic vs. syntactic views of theories ==
The semantic view is typically contrasted with the syntactic view of theories of the logical positivists and logical empiricists, especially Carl Gustav Hempel and Rudolf Carnap. On the contrast between syntactic and semantic views, Bas van Fraassen writes:

The syntactic picture of a theory identifies it with a body of theorems, stated in one particular language chosen for the expression of that theory. This should be contrasted with the alternative of presenting a theory in the first instance by identifying a class of structures as its models. In this second, semantic, approach the language used to express the theory is neither basic nor unique; the same class of structures could well be described in radically different ways, each with its own limitations. The models occupy central stage.

In this same book, van Fraassen, a key founder of the semantic view of theories, critiques the syntactic view in very strong terms:

Perhaps the worst consequence of the syntactic approach was the way it focused attention on philosophically irrelevant technical questions. It is hard not to conclude that those discussions of axiomatizability in restricted vocabularies, 'theoretical terms', Craig’s theorem, 'reduction sentences', 'empirical languages', Ramsey and Carnap sentences, were one and all off the mark—solutions to purely self-generated problems, and philosophically irrelevant. (p. 56)

The semantic view of theories has been extended to other domains, including population genetics.

== See also ==
- Structuralism (philosophy of science)
- Frederick Suppe
