= Frederick Suppe =

American philosopher

Frederick Suppe (/sʌp/; born 1940 in Los Angeles, California) is an American philosopher who is a professor Emeritus of philosophy at the University of Maryland. He has prominent work in the philosophy of science including much work with the semantic view of theories.

== Biography ==
Suppe received his Ph.D. from the University of Michigan and has research interests in the philosophy of science, epistemology and metaphysics, philosophical theology and philosophy of gender.

In 2000 he moved to Texas Tech University where he became chair of the philosophy department. In 2002 he moved to the department of Classical and Modern Languages and Literatures where he was chair from 2002 to 2010. He is currently Professor of Classics, stationed at the Texas Tech Center in Seville, Spain, which he helped develop.

His works on the semantic view of theories include Suppe, Frederick, ed. (1974), The Structure of Scientific Theories and (1989), The Semantic Conception of Theories and Scientific Realism.

== See also ==
- American philosophy
- List of American philosophers
- Scientific structuralism
