= Testability =

Ability to examine a theory by experimentation

Testability is a primary aspect of science and the scientific method. There are two components to testability:

1. Falsifiability or defeasibility, which means that counterexamples to the hypothesis are logically possible.
2. The practical feasibility of observing a reproducible series of such counterexamples if they do exist.

In short, a hypothesis is testable if there is a possibility of deciding whether it is true or false based on experimentation by anyone. This allows anyone to decide whether a theory can be supported or refuted by data. However, the interpretation of experimental data may be also inconclusive or uncertain. Karl Popper introduced the concept that scientific knowledge had the property of falsifiability as published in The Logic of Scientific Discovery.

== See also ==
- Confirmability
- Controllability
- Observability
- Scientific method
- Test method
