= 18th Lambda Literary Awards =

2006 literary awards ceremony

The 18th Lambda Literary Awards were held in 2006, to honor works of LGBT literature published in 2005.

== Nominees and winners ==
Category	Winner	Nominated
Anthologies	E. Lynn Harris, ed., Freedom in This Village: Twenty-Five Years of Black Gay Men's Writing, 1979 to the Present	Anna Camilleri, Red Light: Superheroes, Saints and Sluts; Katherine V. Forrest, Lesbian Pulp Fiction; Wendell Ricketts, Everything I Have is Blue: Short Fiction by Working-Class Men; Emanuel Xavier, Bullets and Butterflies: Queer Spoken Word Poetry
Belles Lettres	Martin Moran, The Tricky Part	Sybille Bedford, Quicksands; Tab Hunter and Eddie Muller, Tab Hunter Confidential; Tania Katan, My One Night Stand with Cancer; Robert Trachtenberg and Tom Bachtell, When I Knew
Biography	Sherrill Tippins, February House	Joshua Gamson, The Fabulous Sylvester; John Geiger, Nothing is True, Everything is Permitted: The Life of Brion Gysin; Mary Meigs and Lise Weil, Beyond Recall; Diana Souhami, Wild Girls: Paris, Sappho and Art
Children's/Young Adult	Shyam Selvadurai, Swimming in the Monsoon Sea	Rigoberto González, Antonio’s Card/La Tarjeta de Antonio; James Howe, Totally Joe; Peter Parnell and Justin Richardson, And Tango Makes Three; Alex Sánchez, Rainbow Road
Erotica	Stacia Seaman and Radclyffe, eds., Stolen Moments: Erotic Interludes 2	Matt Bernstein Sycamore and Richard Labonté, Best Gay Erotica 2006; Eileen Myles and Tristan Taormino, Best Lesbian Erotica 2006; Sacchi Green and Rakelle Valencia, Rode Hard But Away Wet: Lesbian Cowboy Erotica; Sean Wolfe, Close Contact
Gay Debut Fiction	Vestal McIntyre, You Are Not the One: Stories	Mack Friedman, Setting the Lawn on Fire; Richard McCann, Mother of Sorrows; Barry McCrea, The First Verse; Sulayman X, Bilal’s Bread
Gay Fiction	Dennis Cooper, The Sluts	Harlan Greene, The German Officer’s Boy; Aaron Hamburger, Faith for Beginners; Kief Hillsbery, What We Do Is Secret; Keith McDermott, Acqua Calda
Gay Mystery	D. Travers Scott, One of These Things is Not Like the Other	Rick Copp, The Actor’s Guide to Greed; Dorien Grey, The Paper Mirror; Michael Allen Dymmoch, White Tiger; W. Randy Haynes, Cajun Snuff
Gay Poetry	Richard Siken, Crush	Mark Doty, School of the Arts; Timothy Lui, For Dust Thou Art; Martin Pousson, Sugar; Aaron Smith, Blue on Blue Ground
Humor	David Rakoff, Don't Get Too Comfortable	Alison Bechdel, Invasion of Dykes to Watch Out For; Jennifer Camper, Juicy Mother; Kate Clinton, What the L?; Cheryl Peck, Revenge of the Paste Eaters
Lesbian Debut Fiction	Ali Liebegott, The Beautifully Worthless	Katia Noyes, Crashing America; Michelle Embree, Manstealing for Fat Girls; Ronica Black, In Too Deep; Fiona Zedde, Bliss
Lesbian Fiction	Abha Dawesar, Babyji	Helen Humphreys, Wild Dogs; Lauren Sanders, With or Without You; Aren X. Tulchinsky, The Five Books of Moses Lapinsky; Jeanette Winterson, Lighthousekeeping
Lesbian Mystery	Alicia Gaspar de Alba, Desert Blood: The Juarez Murders	Katherine V. Forrest, Women of Mystery; Ellen Hart, The Iron Girl; Penny Mickelbury, Darkness Descending; Radclyffe, Justice Served
Lesbian Poetry	June Jordan, Directed by Desire: Collected Poems	Samiya Bashir, Where the Apple Falls; Jackie Kay, Life Mask; Mary Oliver, New and Selected Poems, Volume II; Amber Flora Thomas, Eye of Water
LGBT Studies	Susan Ackerman, When Heroes Love: The Ambiguities of Eros in the Stories of Gilgamesh and David	Jennifer Kelly, Zest for Life: Lesbians’ Experience of Menopause; Dwight A. McBride, Why I Hate Abercrombie and Fitch; Esther D. Rothblum and Penny Sablove, Lesbian Communities Festivals, Rvs and the Internet; Ruth Vanita, Love’s Rite: Same-Sex Marriage in India and the West
Non-Fiction	Thomas Glave, Words to Our Now	Dennis Altman, Gore Vidal’s America; Keith Boykin, Beyond the Down Low; Peggy Drexler, Raising Boys without Men; Tirza True Latimer, Women Together/Women Apart
Romance	Radclyffe, Distant Shores, Silent Thunder	Randy Boyd, Walt Loves the Bearcat; Gerri Hill, Artist’s Dream; Karin Kallmaker, Just Like That; M. J. Pearson, The Price of Temptation
Science fiction, fantasy or horror	Katherine V. Forrest, Daughters of an Emerald Dusk	Octavia Butler, Fledgling; David B. Coe, Shapers of Darkness; Jane Fletcher, Temple Landfall; Jeanne G'Fellers, No Sister of Mine
Spirituality	Cheri DiNovo, Qu(e)erying Evangelism: Growing a Community from the Outside In	Munya Andrews, The Seven Sisters of the Pleiades; Michael Thomas Ford, The Path of the Green Man; Daniel Gebhardt, I Am This One Walking Beside Me; Craig Hickman, Fumbling Toward Divinity
Transgender	Charlie Anders, Choir Boy	Judith Halberstam, In a Queer Time and Place; Tennessee Jones, Deliver Me from Nowhere; Matt Kailey, Just Add Hormones; Deborah Rudacille, The Riddle of Gender
