= What We Do Is Secret =

What We Do Is Secret may refer to:

- "What We Do Is Secret", a song by the Germs from the 1979 album (GI)
- What We Do Is Secret (EP), a 1981 EP by the Germs released after their breakup
- What We Do Is Secret (film), a 2007 biographical film about the Germs
- What We Do Is Secret (novel), a 2005 novel by Thorn Kief Hillsbery
