= Driver Theory Test =

A Driver Theory Test refers to a test taken when learning to drive.

Countries that utilise a theory test as part of driver training are:

- Ireland
- United Kingdom
