= Zanesville (novel) =

2005 novel by Kris Saknussemm

- Cover of first edition (paperback)
- Author: Kris Saknussemm
- Cover artist: Christopher Sergio
- Language: English
- Genre: Science fiction
- Published: 2005 (Villard Books)
- Publication place: United States
- Media type: Print (paperback)
- Pages: 496 pp
- ISBN: 0-8129-7416-6
- OCLC: 57641675
- Dewey Decimal: 813/.6 22
- LC Class: PS3619.A425 Z24 2005

Zanesville is a science fiction novel written by Kris Saknussemm and published by Villard Books, an imprint of Random House in 2005.

== Plot summary ==
The story is set forty years into the future, in an America in which distinctions between government, religion, and corporations have vanished. The main character, Elijah Clearfather, is found by a resistance cell outside their camouflaged borders in Central Park, New York City. After the cell witnesses the Clearfather's powers, they learn a little about his true identity but decide, in the interests of everyone, to send him away, with the only safe clues to his identity they can provide: a bus pass marked with three important locations and a note written in disappearing ink. Clearfather is set on a journey of self-discovery pursued by murderous Vitessa Cultporation agents, and accompanied by Aretha Nightengale, once a lawyer, now a cross-dressing resistance leader; Dooley Duck and Ubba Dubba, hologram cartoon characters leading a sexual revolution; and the mysterious Kokomo.

== Reception ==
Zanesville has been called a "revolutionary work of surreal black comedy," and touted as being "pretty cool" with "good word play" by Rudy Rucker. The novel was hailed by The Austin Chronicle in 2005 as "the most original novel of the year." The novel is said to have offended fringe feminist groups and conservative organizations like the Right to Life movement, the Catholic Church and the Republican Party. In 2007 the author of Zanesville threatened to sue Michael Jackson upon reports that the singer was going to erect a giant robotic model of himself in Las Vegas, claiming the idea was his.
