= Theory test =

Theory test may refer to:

- The two-part theory section of the United Kingdom driving test
- The computerised test required to obtain a Driving licence in the Republic of Ireland
- Any of the similar tests required in many other countries, see driving test and driver's license.
