= Bobby Henderson (activist) =

American satirist and activist (born 1980)

- Born: July 18, 1980 (age 46); Roseburg, Oregon, US
- Education: Oregon State University
- Known for: Founder of Pastafarianism

Bobby Henderson is an American satirist and activist, known for being the founder of Pastafarianism, a parody religion.

== Early life and education ==
Henderson was born on July 18, 1980, in Roseburg, Oregon. He studied physics at Oregon State University.

== Pastafarianism ==
In 2005, Henderson founded the religion of Pastafarianism in response to the Kansas State Board of Education's decision to teach intelligent design alongside evolution in schools. He requested that "Pastafarianism" be taught alongside intelligent design and "logical conjecture based on overwhelming observable evidence". After his protest letter to the board was ignored, he posted it online and the beliefs quickly gained traction.

In 2006, he wrote The Gospel of the Flying Spaghetti Monster, a book detailing the core beliefs of the religion. He suggested that all the proceedings from the book would go into building a (tax-free) pirate ship that would travel the world and spread the gospel about Pastafarianism, "like a floating church".

In 2019, Henderson repeated his belief that religion should be kept out of government schools and money kept out of religion.
