= Tom Bachtell =

American cartoonist

- Born: Thomas Myron Bachtell; November 6, 1957 (age 69)
- Education: Yellow Springs High School; Cleveland Institute of Music; Case Western Reserve University
- Occupations: Illustrator, Caricaturist, Pianist, Dance instructor, Dancer
- Years active: 1987–present
- Partner: Andrew Patner (1990-2015)

Tom Bachtell is a self-taught artist who is an illustrator and caricaturist for The New Yorker's Talk of the Town as well as other sections, contributing regularly for 23 years. He has done work for Entertainment Weekly, Newsweek, Forbes, Bon Appétit, Town & Country, Mother Jones, New York, Poetry, the New York Times, the Wall Street Journal, the New York Observer and London's Evening Standard as well as Marshall Field, Lands' End and the chamber-music series at the University of Chicago as part of his ad-campaign clientele. His brush-and-ink style is considered to be reminiscent of American cartoonists from the 1920s and 1930s. He was a finalist for the 18th Lambda Literary Awards as illustrator along with editor Robert Trachtenberg for the book When I Knew under the Belles Lettres category.

== Early life and education ==
Tom Bachtell was interested in drawing as a child and was especially fixated on the older works from New Yorker cartoonists from the 1930s and 1940s such as Peter Arno, Charles Addams, James Thurber, Syd Hoff and Al Hirschfeld. His mother, an editor and writer, encouraged him to draw. The earliest portrait he did is that of his mother when he was 4 or 5 years old. When he was 10, he drew his impression of the guests at his parents' cocktail party at their Ohio home on a portable chalkboard. He saw the adults as fancily dressed, laughing and drinking. He remembered enjoying it. He never planned it but thought it was good and had social satire in it.

Tom graduated from Yellow Springs High School in 1975. He thought drawing was not a legitimate career so he pursued other interests and went to university and conservatory. He majored in English and music (under the Joint Music Program at Cleveland Institute of Music) and minored in dance at Case Western Reserve University. He trained as a pianist and studied the harpsichord at the Cleveland Institute of Music. During college, he drew for friends and for himself. He graduated his liberal arts degree magna cum laude in 1980. In his early 20s he started a modern dance company. At a point Tom thought he wouldn't be good enough to make a living from performing music. After finishing college, he decided to teach himself how to draw and make a living from it.

== Early career ==
In 1983, Bachtell moved to Chicago and worked as a copywriter at Montgomery Ward. He observed other illustrations, then drew his own illustrations and sent his work to art directors. Mare Early, an art director for the Chicago Tribune, called him in to show his work. He then got jobs in Chicago, working for the Chicago Tribune (which led to him quitting his copywriting job) as well as some other publications and doing a caricature of Tom Wolfe for Advertising Age. Bachtell's illustrations appeared in the Chicago Reader from 1990 through 1992.

== The New Yorker ==
Around that time, The New Yorker editor Robert Gottlieb was actively seeking to incorporate more illustrations into the magazine, and was looking for illustrators to hire. In 1989, after seeing Bachtell's caricature of Tom Wolfe in another magazine, New Yorker art director Chris Curry called Bachtell and hired him to do occasional caricatures for the "Goings on About Town" section. The first illustration of Bachtell's published in The New Yorker was of David Byrne in the 30 October 1989 issue. (Coincidentally, Charles Addams drew the cover for that issue.) Bachtell continued to draw for "Goings on About Town" and other sections through early 1995; his subjects during that time included Kris Kristofferson, Madonna, and a young Allison Janney (at the time performing in a short-lived off-Broadway play Five Women Wearing the Same Dress).

Bachtell began drawing for the "Talk of the Town" section of The New Yorker with the 20 March 1995 issue. He drew four illustrations for that issue, including of Conan O'Brien and the cast of Absolutely Fabulous. At first Bachtell was one of a rotating cast of "Talk of the Town" illustrators, including Eric Palma, Michael Witte, Robert Risko, and others, but by June 1997 he was the sole illustrator for the section. Bachtell drew for "Talk of the Town" for 23 years; his final illustrations for the section ran in the 9/16 July 2018 issue. His work has appeared in various sections over the years; overall, Bachtell has drawn over 2800 illustrations for The New Yorker.

== Other media ==
In 2005, Bachtell was a finalist for the 18th Annual Lambda Literary Awards as illustrator along with editor Robert Trachtenberg for the book "When I Knew" under the Belles Lettres category.

In 2016, Bachtell drew the book cover for Mark Singer's book Trump and Me, published by Penguin Random House.

In 2018, Bachtell drew Supreme Court Justice Ruth Bader Ginsburg for the CD cover of Notorious RBG in Song, performed by vocalist Patrice Michaels and pianist Kuang-Hao Huang. The CD was released by Cedille Records 8 June 2018.

== Style and technique ==
Bachtell took only one life drawing class and avoided art classes in order to develop a natural style. He thought the art classes were strict, pompous, would make him obsessed with technique and weren't fun. He developed his own style through experimentation and observation. Through his unorthodox methods, he learnt and discovered a lot by accident, using his ignorance to experiment with tools. When he first started coloring he would create masks out of contact paper and used anything to create color such as using deodorant to draw clouds. He had no knowledge of brush types, techniques and materials and would buy interesting brushes to experiment with them. He primarily works in black and white, however, he has also done color works outside of the New Yorker. In his current process, he superimposes different heads over others on paper and will draw a variety of caricatures in order to achieve the type of caricature he is looking for and remain adaptable. His style is said to be "fluid, spontaneous".

== Personal life ==
Bachtell met Chicago writer and music critic Andrew Patner in 1989; their relationship lasted until Patner's death in 2015.

Tom is currently an active chamber pianist and teaches and performs swing dancing, mainly the Lindy and Balboa.

== Honors ==
In 2016, Bachtell was inducted into the Chicago LGBT Hall of Fame.

== See also ==
- 18th Lambda Literary Awards
- Andrew Patner
