= Never Mind Nirvana =

2000 novel by Mark Lindquist

- Author: Mark Lindquist
- Language: English
- Genre: Fiction
- Set in: Seattle
- Publisher: Villard Books
- Publication date: 2000
- Publication place: United States
- Media type: Print
- Pages: 239
- ISBN: 067946302X
- OCLC: 43060547

Never Mind Nirvana is the third novel by Mark Lindquist. The hardcover was published in 2000.

== Summary ==
Never Mind Nirvana is set in the Seattle music scene. A Publishers Weekly reviewer stated, "For those who were or are part of the scene Lindquist chronicles, the colorful legal battle and the hordes of monosyllabic hipsters who swarm through this world-weary paean to Seattle may indeed resonate."

The novel chronicles the misadventures of a former musician who becomes a prosecutor. Stylistic quirks include real characters from the Seattle scene interacting with fictional characters. "One of the many pleasures of Never Mind Nirvana is in its rightness of local details.... Lindquist's penchant for the truth pays off, for his novel gives us a Seattle we can recognize." (Claire Dederer, Seattle Times).

Eric Brace in The Washington Post stated, "Just the right mix of truth and sentiment, with a happy lack of cool irony ... and dialogue that's absolutely pitch perfect ... it feels as if we will see a movie called Never Mind Nirvana in the multiplexes sometime next year. But it won't be as good as the book."

Stephanie Zacharek in the New York Times stated that "Books that draw on the richness of pop culture can be pure delight, or they can be too taken with their own cleverness to make much of an impression. Mark Lindquist's third novel, Never Mind Nirvana, falls somewhere in the middle."
