= The Gospel of the Flying Spaghetti Monster =

Book by Bobby Henderson

- First edition cover
- Author: Bobby Henderson
- Language: English
- Genre: Satirical religious text
- Publisher: Villard Books
- Publication date: March 28, 2006
- Publication place: United States
- Media type: Print (hardback)
- Pages: 192 pp
- ISBN: 0-8129-7656-8
- OCLC: 65065501
- Dewey Decimal: 818/.607 22
- LC Class: PN6231.R4 H46 2006

The Gospel of the Flying Spaghetti Monster is a satirical book written by Bobby Henderson that embodies the main beliefs of the parody religion of the Church of the Flying Spaghetti Monster or Pastafarianism. Some Pastafarians say that they believe in the Flying Spaghetti Monster literally, while others regard it as satire; the church states that membership does not require literal belief. The Flying Spaghetti Monster (FSM) was created by Bobby Henderson in an open letter to the Kansas State Board of Education in which he parodied the concept of intelligent design to argue against it being taught in public schools. After Henderson posted the letter on his website, it became an internet phenomenon and was featured in many large newspapers, which caught the attention of book publishers. Released in March 2006 by Villard Books, The Gospel elaborates on Pastafarian beliefs and practices established in the open letter.

The Gospel includes a creation myth, set of eight "I'd Really Rather You Didn'ts", a guide to evangelizing, and discusses history and lifestyle from a Pastafarian perspective. Henderson uses satire and comedy to show flaws with creationism and prove the Flying Spaghetti Monster, offering an alternative to the intelligent design movement in the process. The book, which has sold more than 100,000 copies, was generally well received.

== Background ==
In 2005, Bobby Henderson, then a 24-year-old Oregon State University physics graduate, parodied the concept of intelligent design by professing belief in a Flying Spaghetti Monster in an open letter to the Kansas State Board of Education. He sent the letter prior to the Kansas evolution hearings as a satirical protest against the teaching of intelligent design in biology classes. In his letter, he noted,

I think we can all look forward to the time when these three theories are given equal time in our science classrooms across the country, and eventually the world; One third time for Intelligent Design, one third time for Flying Spaghetti Monsterism, and one third time for logical conjecture based on overwhelming observable evidence.

— Bobby Henderson

In May, having received no reply from the Kansas State Board of Education, Henderson posted the letter on his website. Shortly thereafter, Pastafarianism became an internet phenomenon. As public awareness grew, the mainstream media picked up on the phenomenon. The Flying Spaghetti Monster became a symbol for the case against intelligent design in public education. The open letter was printed in many large newspapers, including The New York Times, The Washington Post, and Chicago Sun Times, and received "worldwide press attention" according to one journalist.

According to Henderson, newspaper articles attracted the attention of book publishers; at one point, six publishers were interested in the Flying Spaghetti Monster. In November 2005, Henderson received an $80,000 advance from Villard to write The Gospel of the Flying Spaghetti Monster. Henderson said that he planned to use the proceeds to build a pirate ship, with which he would spread the Pastafarian religion. The book was released on March 28, 2006.

== Summary ==
The book is necessary so that people see how much hard evidence supports the existence of the FSM. You can make a pretty strong argument for His existence. Especially if you use the same sort of reasoning the [intelligent design] people do: specious reasoning and circular logic.

— Bobby Henderson, explaining why he wrote The Gospel

The Gospel presents the tenets of Pastafarianism—often satires of creationism—elaborating on the "beliefs" established in the open letter. It includes a creation-myth, a "propaganda" guide for evangelizing, some pseudo-scientific "proofs", and several pasta puns. Along with crude drawings and altered stock photography, Henderson employs irony to present perceived flaws with evolution and discusses history and lifestyle from a Pastafarian perspective. The book also provides a Pastafarian "Guide to the Holidays." Furthermore, Henderson discusses the original Pastafarian "belief" that the decline in the number of pirates, who are revered by Pastafarians, has directly led to a rise in global temperature. He provides further "evidence" of this relationship with the observation "that many people dress up as pirates for Halloween, and the months following October 31 are generally cooler than those that precede it." This and other scientific claims made by Henderson are intended to be disputed. The claim that declining numbers of pirates have resulted in rising temperatures is meant to demonstrate that correlation does not imply causation.

The book urges readers to practice Pastafarianism with a 30 day free trial, saying, "If you don't like us, your old god will most likely take you back." Henderson states on his website that more than 100,000 copies of the book have been sold.

== Pastafarian creation myth ==
The Gospel begins with the creation of the universe by an invisible and undetectable Holy Flying Spaghetti Monster. On the first day, the Flying Spaghetti Monster separated light from darkness; on the second, because He could not tread water for long and had grown tired of flying, He created the land—complemented by a beer volcano. Satisfied, the Flying Spaghetti Monster overindulged in beer from the beer volcano and woke up hung over. Between drunken nights and clumsy afternoons, the Flying Spaghetti Monster produced seas and land (for a second time, accidentally, because he forgot that he created it the day before) along with Heaven and a "midget", which he named Man. Man and an equally short woman lived happily in the Olive Garden of Eden for some time until the Flying Spaghetti Monster caused a global flood in a cooking accident.

This creation is described as having happened only 5,000 years ago. Because of evidence of things dating before 5,000 years, Henderson satirically retorts that the Flying Spaghetti Monster presented all evidence to the contrary in order to test Pastafarians' faith. In addition to parodying certain biblical literalists, Henderson uses this unorthodox method to lampoon intelligent design proponents, whom, he believes, first "define [their] conclusion and then gather evidence to support it".

== Captain Mosey and the Eight "I'd Really Rather You Didn'ts" ==
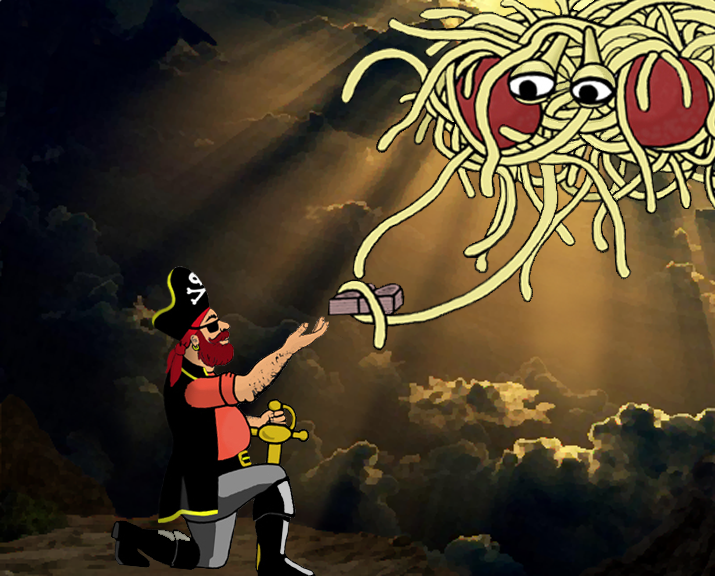
FSM giving the "I'd Really Rather You Didn'ts" tablets to Captain Mosey

The book contains the Eight "I'd Really Rather You Didn'ts", adherence to which enables Pastafarians to ascend to heaven, which includes a stripper factory and beer volcano. According to The Gospel, Mosey the Pirate captain received ten stone tablets as advice from the Flying Spaghetti Monster. Of these original ten "I'd Really Rather You Didn'ts", two were dropped on the way down from Mount Salsa. This event "partly accounts for Pastafarians' flimsy moral standards." The "I'd Really Rather You Didn'ts" address a broad array of behavior, from sexual conduct to nutrition. One reviewer commented that this parody of the Ten Commandments "reads like a bitter shopping list of the same criticisms" given to organized religions. One commandment is "I'd really rather you didn't build multimillion-dollar synagogues / churches / temples / mosques / shrines to [His] Noodly Goodness when the money could be better spent ending poverty, curing diseases, living in peace, loving with passion and lowering the cost of cable."

== Translations ==
Translations of The Gospel of the Flying Spaghetti Monster
Year	Language	Translator	Title	Publisher	Notes
2006	Japanese	Natsumi Kataoka	空飛ぶスパゲッティ・モンスターの福音書	Tsujiki Shokan	ISBN 9784806713401
2008	French	Diniz Galhos	L'Évangile du Monstre en spaghettis volant	Le Cherche midi	ISBN 9782749111186
2008	Italian	Marco Lunari	Il libro sacro del Prodigioso Spaghetto Volante	Mondadori	ISBN 9788804574491
2008	German	Jörn Ingwersen	Das Evangelium des fliegenden Spaghettimonsters	Goldmann	ISBN 9783442546282
2010	Turkish	Umut Ulus, Uğraş Turan Öner	Uçan Spagetti Canavarı'nın kutsal kitabı	Altıkırkbeş Yayın	ISBN 9786055532093
2015	Russian	Mikhail Samin	Евангелие Летающего Макаронного Монстра		ISBN 9785447496692
2016	Danish	Inger Winkelmann	Evangeliet om Det Flyvende Spaghettimonster	Gyldendal	ISBN 9788702210330

== Critical reception ==
Scientific American described The Gospel as "an elaborate spoof on Intelligent Design" and "very funny". In 2006, it was nominated for the Quill Award in Humor, but did not win. Wayne Alan Brenner of The Austin Chronicle characterized the book as "a necessary bit of comic relief in the overly serious battle between science and superstition." Simon Singh of the Daily Telegraph wrote that the Gospel "might be slightly repetitive... but overall it is a brilliant, provocative, witty and important gem of a book." Reviewers at both the University of Pittsburgh and Penn State were generally positive about the book. In his book The God Delusion, biologist Richard Dawkins commented: "I am happy to see that the Gospel of the Flying Spaghetti Monster has been published as a book, to great acclaim."

Casey Luskin of the Discovery Institute, the hub of the Intelligent Design movement, labeled the Gospel "a mockery of the Christian New Testament".

== Sources ==
- Bobby Henderson. The Gospel of the Flying Spaghetti Monster. (2006). ISBN 0-8129-7656-8
  - This version has a white cover showing a hardcover version with ribbon, the UK hardcover edition from HarperCollins later used the depicted design.
- Bobby Henderson. The Gospel of the Flying Spaghetti Monster (hardcover). (2006). ISBN 0-00-723160-1
