= Mel Plaut =

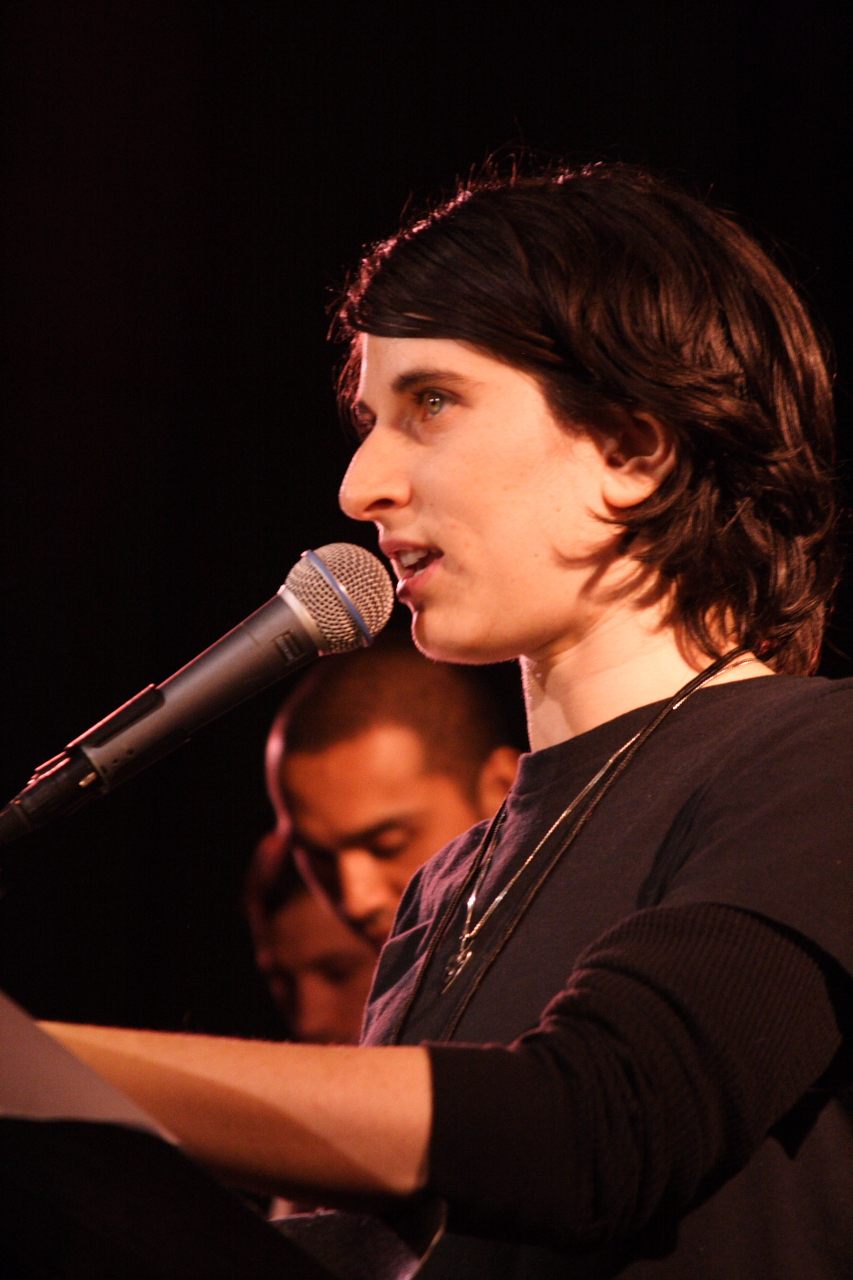
Plaut in 2007

Mel Plaut is an American writer from New York City.

Plaut ran a blog from 2005 to 2008 called "New York Hack" about her career as a New York City taxi driver. In 2007, writing as Melissa, their book Hack: How I Stopped Worrying About What to Do with My Life and Started Driving a Yellow Cab was published by Villard. At the time of publication, women made up only about 200 of the 40,000 cab drivers in NYC.

Plaut has written for The New York Times, The Huffington Post, and has had essays air on NPR's All Things Considered and Weekend America. They were educated at the University at Buffalo, the University of East Anglia, the University of New Mexico (BA, 1997) and City University of New York-Hunter College (MUP).

In 2016, Plaut was featured in the HBO documentary Suited, produced by Lena Dunham. In 2017, Plaut married Katherine Anania and in 2019, published an essay in HuffPost about moving to rural Georgia and discovering Southern queer gun groups.
