= I, Pastafari =

2019 documentary film

I, Pastafari: A Flying Spaghetti Monster Story is a 2019 documentary film directed by Michael Arthur.

== Plot ==
The film features followers and members of the Church of the Flying Spaghetti Monster, called 'Pastafari', as they practice and campaign politically, legally and socially to obtain the same privileges and legal exemptions granted to religions. The cast include Samir Alloui, Niko Alm, Brother Spaghettus, Edward J. Larson, and Daniel Dennett.

== Reception ==
On 5 October 2019, the film had its world premiere at the Nashville Film Festival, followed by screenings at other festivals in the U.S.A. and around the globe.

The film received mostly positive reviews, including in The Hollywood Reporter, Newsweek, The Guardian, Die Presse and Westdeutsche Zeitung.
