= Andrew Patner =

American journalist

- Born: December 17, 1959; Chicago, Illinois, U.S.
- Died: February 3, 2015 (aged 55); Chicago, Illinois, U.S.
- Education: Kenwood Academy; University of Wisconsin-Madison (B.A.); University of Chicago Law School
- Occupations: Journalist, broadcaster, Arts critic, author, interviewer
- Partner: Tom Bachtell

Andrew Patner (December 17, 1959 – February 3, 2015) was an American Chicago-based journalist, broadcaster, critic, and interviewer.

Patner was born in Chicago and attended Kenwood Academy. He went on to attend the College of the University of Chicago, where he served as editor-in-chief of the student newspaper, The Chicago Maroon from 1979 to 1980.

Patner received a BA in history from the University of Wisconsin at Madison in 1985. He attended the University of Chicago Law School, but left the program in 1988 to further pursue a career in journalism. His book, I.F. Stone: a portrait, about the iconoclastic journalist I.F. Stone was published in the same year. From 1989 to 1990, Patner served as a staff reporter for The Wall Street Journal.

Beginning in 1991, Patner was a regular contributor of arts criticism to the Chicago Sun-Times. Patner contributed over 2,000 pieces of arts criticism covering a broad range of topics including music, dance, books, and film. Beginning in 2006, he served as the publication's classical music and opera critic. Patner worked for Chicago's National Public Radio affiliate WBEZ for eight years as an arts critic, program host, and producer. He also served as critic-at-large for WFMT Fine Arts Radio, where he hosted a weekly program called "Critical Thinking" from 1998 until his death in 2015.

While working as editor-in-chief for the Chicago Maroon in 1979, Patner began covering LGBT subjects, including the first National March on Washington for Lesbian and Gay Rights. In 1993, Patner became the first regular writer for a mainstream Chicago newspaper to write about being gay. His partner of 25 years, Tom Bachtell, is an acclaimed illustrator for The New Yorker magazine.

Patner died suddenly in 2015.
