= Kris Saknussemm =

American novelist

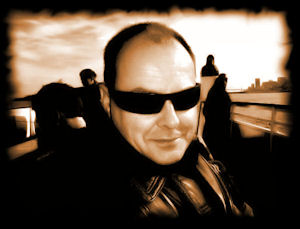
- Kris Saknussemm In 2007
- Born: June 28, 1961 (age 65); Berkeley, California, U.S.
- Occupation: Author
- Known for: Zanesville
- Political party: The Surprise Party
- Website: Saknussemm.com - Deviance with a difference Saknussemm on MySpace Gag Rule - The Saknussemm Blog

Kris Saknussemm (born June 28, 1961) is a cult novelist and multimedia artist. Born and educated in America, he has lived most of his life abroad, primarily in Australia and the Pacific Islands. He has published ten books that have been translated into 22 languages.

His science fiction themed novel Zanesville, published by Villard Books, an imprint of Random House in 2005, was hailed by critics as a revolutionary work of surreal black comedy. It has attracted the devotion of outsider artists like the Legendary Stardust Cowboy and, according to Saknussemm, was the inspiration for Michael Jackson to want to have a giant robot of himself constructed to roam the Las Vegas desert.

Another key novel, the erotic supernatural thriller Private Midnight is set in a noir crime world of jazz, junkies and shadows from out of time.

== The Rumors ==
Soon after the publication of Zanesville, reports began circulating around Hollywood that the actor Kevin Costner was furious about being featured as the "voice" of Dooley Duck, one of several animated hologram characters in the story, who serve as advertising vehicles in the fictional world of the novel. Under the magical influence of the protagonist, Elijah Clearfather, Dooley not only comes to life and breaks free of his commercial masters (a monolithic children's day care empire) he develops a penis and becomes an advocate for sexual enjoyment and the leader of a social and political reform called The Surprise Party.

A second rumor that began making the rounds that Zanesville had actually been written by David Foster Wallace under a pseudonym, while another related and more detailed story had it that Kris Saknussemm is not an individual author at all, but rather a name taken by a collective of writers who wrote the book as a collaborative experiment, in something of the same spirit as the Nicolas Bourbaki phenomenon amongst mathematicians.

This latter view gained some extended support as Saknussemm had written about the "Bourbaki Conspiracy," and an earlier published story was based on the premise that the reclusive Thomas Pynchon was just a composite entity—an ongoing project and artistic prank which such writers as Vladimir Nabokov, Kurt Vonnegut and J.D. Salinger had participated in.

Appearing at Elliott Bay Book Company in Seattle in 2006, Saknussemm fielded questions about the rumor, remarking, "As Zanesville has much to do with the idea of the conspiracy theory as the folk religion of our time, I'm somewhat amused. But I've heard something similar about Poppy Z. Brite. I think we all just like hoaxes and rumors. They reassure us that we can actually participate in the manufacture of reality. But as one of my characters says, 'I'm real enough.'" A series of readings in New York and appearances on public radio and at the Squaw Valley Community of Writers helped to dispel the rumor.

== Published works ==
- In the Name of the Father (poetry) (1988, The False Frontier Press)
- Zanesville (2005, Villard Books)
- Private Midnight (2009, The Overlook Press)
- Enigmatic Pilot (2011, Del Rey Ballantine Books)
- Sinister Miniatures (2011, Lazy Fascist Press)
- The Colors of Compulsion (2012, Les Editions du Zaporogue)
- Reverend America (2012, Dark Coast Press)
- Eat Jellied Eels and Think Distant Thoughts (2012, PS Publishing)
- Sea Monkeys (memoir) (2012, Soft Skull Press)
- The Humble Assessment (2013, Lazy Fascist Press)
