= War Boy =

2000 novel by Thorn Kief Hillsbery

- Author: Kief Hillsbery
- Language: English
- Genre: Fiction
- Published: 2000, William Morrow & Co
- Media type: Book
- Pages: 335
- ISBN: 9780688171414
- OCLC: 701799267

War Boy is the first novel by Kief Hillsbery, published in 2000 by Rob Weisbach Books, an imprint of William Morrow and Company.

== Plot outline ==
Radboy, a fourteen-year-old deaf skateboarder, leaves his abusive home for San Francisco and becomes involved with environmental politics and the underground club scene. Principal characters include Radboy's older friend Jonnyboy, methamphetamine addict boyfriends Finn and Critter, and a Swedish environmentalist, Ula, whose fiancé has died, and who is seeking revenge for her sister's injury from a government-planted car bomb. Together the five plan to bomb the Hobart Building and kidnap Jonnyboy's boyfriend Roarke, in an attempt to save the redwoods. Hillsbery writes with a stream-of-consciousness narration style and frequently uses abbreviation and other teen slang.

== Reception ==
War Boy had a mixed reception on publication. Advocate rates it a "tentative thumbs-up", describing it as disjointed and difficult to follow, but with a realism potentially appealing to young gay and lesbian teens. Jonathan Alexander of Lambda Book Report gives a more favorable review: "You don't always believe the characters, but you admire their punk bravado...War Boy is its own declaration of optimistic dissatisfaction, candid critique, and guerilla slapstick." Peter Marcus of Gay & Lesbian Review Worldwide writes, "Sometimes the ride is fun, sometimes not, and all too often the internal monologue detracts from plot. Still, it is when the narrative pace slows down that we see Hillsbery's best writing, which is often beautiful, rich, and tender."

== See also ==
- Eco-terrorism
