= Thorn Kief Hillsbery =

American novelist

- Born: Portland, Oregon, U.S.
- Education: Evergreen State College
- Occupation: Novelist

Thorn Kief Hillsbery is an American novelist. He is the author of War Boy (2000), What We Do Is Secret (2005), which was nominated for a Lambda Literary Award, and Empire Made (2017). He was born in Portland, Oregon, and attended Evergreen State College. His articles about skateboarding, surfing, and rock climbing have appeared in Rolling Stone, Mountain Gazette, and Outside, for which he also served as a contributing editor. He has previously taught a creative writing workshop at Columbia University.

Hillsbery is openly gay and was personally involved in the early days of the Los Angeles punk scene.

== Bibliography ==
- War Boy, Rob Weisbach Books, 2000. ISBN 0-688-17141-9
- What We Do Is Secret, Villard, 2005. ISBN 0-8129-7309-7
- Empire Made, Houghton Mifflin Harcourt, 2017. (in press)
