= Katia Noyes =

American author

Katia Noyes is an American author whose works have appeared in many publications and anthologies. Her debut novel, Crashing America, was a Book Sense Notable Book in 2005, and was chosen as one of the Ten Best Gay/Lesbian Books of 2005 by Amazon.com and the UK's Rainbow Network.

A third generation Californian who was raised on the Stanford University campus, Noyes lives in the Glen Park neighborhood of San Francisco.
