= What We Do Is Secret (novel) =

2005 novel by Thorn Kief Hillsbery

- What We Do Is Secret book cover
- Author: Thorn Kief Hillsbery
- Language: English
- Genre: punk literature, LGBT literature
- Set in: Los Angeles
- Publisher: Villard
- Publication date: 2005
- Publication place: United States
- Media type: Print (paperback)
- Pages: 346 pp
- ISBN: 0-8129-7309-7 (paperback edition)
- OCLC: 55877401

What We Do Is Secret is the second punk novel by Thorn Kief Hillsbery, published by Villard in 2005, with a subsequent e-book edition released in 2007. The novel was nominated for a Lambda Literary Award in fiction. Writing for Out, Aaron Hamburger named it one of the top five books of 2005 and "a wild ride of a novel that careens through a fateful evening in L.A.'s punk scene."

What We Do Is Secret takes place in Los Angeles in 1981, six months after the death of Darby Crash (lead singer of the Germs). It is narrated by hustler and street punk Rockets Redglare, who knew Darby personally. Like a punk American Graffiti, the action occurs over the course of 24 hours,"as Rockets amps up for another night looking for tricks and scrounging a meal, Sex Pistols and X lyrics on repeat in his head...he’s come to a turning point–the scene is changing, and nothing’s as easy as it was when Darby brought him into the fold." Though the novel is a work of fiction, numerous real-life figures from the L.A. punk scene make appearances. The first edition cover image is by influential skate photographer Tobin Yelland.

== Synopsis ==
Set over the course of a single day, the narrative moves from day to night and from east ("East of La Brea") to west ("West of the West"), from Hollywood to a secret surf spot in-between the old Pacific Ocean Park pilings in Santa Monica where the book's rain-swept denouement takes place.

Narrator Rockets and his crew of street punks, Siouxie, Squid, and Blitzer, turn tricks and pull off various capers to make enough money to buy drugs (typically poppers, tabs, and the amphetamine derivative Desoxyn) and make it to the night's punk show at The Vex. Despite his age, Rockets is accepted as one of the gang, but he is secretly scared of being returned to a group home.

Rockets is a throwaway kid, abandoned at birth by his junkie parents, and he found a home among the misfits drawn to the Masque, the basement epicenter of L.A.'s nascent punk scene. He and Darby had a sexual relationship and Rockets, like many in the scene, looked up to Darby. Rockets was aware, however, that he was often manipulated by Darby's mind games and talent for controlling people. After Darby's suicide by heroin overdose, the scene has begun to fragment. Rockets and Blitzer, a heroin addict, gradually become more intimate, sexually and otherwise. Blitzer holds out the hope of a new life for the two of them together in Idaho. When two gay tourists turn up looking for drugs and subsequently hire the crew to show them around L.A., Blitzer devises a scheme to get the money he and Rockets need to skip town and leave their lives on the Hollywood streets behind.
