= Villard (imprint) =

Publishing imprint of Random House

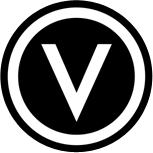
- Parent company: Ballantine Books; Random House
- Founded: 1983
- Country of origin: United States
- Headquarters location: New York City, New York
- Publication types: Books
- Official website: ballantine.atrandom.com

Villard, also known as Villard Books, is a publishing imprint of Random House, one of the largest publishing companies in the world, owned in full by Bertelsmann since its acquisition of a final 25% stake in 2019, and grouped in Penguin Random House since 2013. Villard was founded in 1983.

Villard began as an independent imprint of Random House and is currently a sub-imprint of Ballantine Books, itself an imprint of Random House. It was named after a Stanford White brownstone mansion on Madison Avenue that was the home of Random House for twenty years.

== Books ==
1985

- The Bill James Historical Baseball Abstract, Bill James

1987

- Learned Pigs & Fireproof Women, Ricky Jay
- Pattern Crimes, William Bayer

1988

- All I Really Need to Know I Learned in Kindergarten, Robert Fulghum

1989

- Jacob the Baker: Gentle Wisdom for a Complicated World, Noah Benshea

1990

- Latin for All Occasions, Henry Beard

1991

- Kiss the Hand You Cannot Bite: Rise and Fall of the Ceauşescus, Edward Behr

1992

- Let Me Take You Down: Inside the Mind of Mark David Chapman, the Man Who Shot John Lennon, Jack Jones
- The Official Politically Correct Dictionary and Handbook, Henry Beard and Christopher Cerf

1993

- Different Loving: the World of Sexual Dominance and Submission, Gloria Brame
- Hate on Trial: The Case Against America's Most Dangerous Neo-Nazi, Morris Dees & Steve Fiffer
- The Fifties, David Halberstam
- Primal Fear, William Diehl

1994

- Behind the Times: Inside the New New York Times, Edwin Diamond.
- Same-Sex Unions in Pre-Modern Europe, John Boswell
- Saved by the Light: The True Story of a Man who Died Twice and the Profound Revelations He Received, Dannion Brinkley and Paul Perry, ISBN 0-679-43176-4
- Mary Cassatt: A Life, Nancy Mowll Mathews
- The Official NBA Basketball Encyclopedia

1995

- Bone in the Throat, Anthony Bourdain
- The Grand Ole Opry: History of Country Music. 70 Years of the Songs, the Stars and the Stories, Paul Kingsbury
- Wonder Boys, Michael Chabon
- American Empress: The Life and Times of Marjorie Merriweather Post, Nancy Rubin Stuart

1996

- Into the Wild, Jon Krakauer
- The Sparrow, Mary Doria Russell

1997

- Gone Bamboo, Anthony Bourdain.
- Into Thin Air: A Personal Account of the Mt. Everest Disaster, Jon Krakauer

1998

- Children of God, Mary Doria Russell

2000

- The Very Persistent Gappers of Frip, written by George Saunders, illustrated by Lane Smith
- Anthropology: And a Hundred Other Stories, Dan Rhodes
- Never Mind Nirvana, Mark Lindquist

2001

- Necessary Targets, Eve Ensler

2003

- Vagabonding: An uncommon guide to the art of long-term world travel, Rolf Potts
- A Round-Heeled Woman: My Late-Life Adventures in Sex and Romance, Jane Juska

2004

- Counterculture Through the Ages: From Abraham to Acid House, Ken Goffman.

2005

- What We Do Is Secret, Thorn Kief Hillsbery
- Zanesville, Kris Saknussemm

2006

- The Gospel of the Flying Spaghetti Monster, Bobby Henderson

2007

- Hack: How I Stopped Worrying About What to Do with My Life and Started Driving a Yellow Cab, written by Melissa Plaut
- Macedonia, written by Harvey Pekar and Heather Roberson, with illustrations by Ed Piskor
- Check the Technique: Liner Notes for Hip-Hop Junkies, Brian Coleman

2008

- Nose Down, Eyes Up, Merrill Markoe
- The Big Skinny, Carol Lay
- How Can I Keep From Singing (revised edition), biography of Pete Seeger, by David Dunaway
- The presidential book of lists: from most to least, elected to rejected, worst to cursed: Fascinating facts about our chief executives, Ian Randal Strock

2009

- Farewell, My Subaru, Doug Fine

2010

- I Am an Emotional Creature: The Secret Life of Girls Around the World, Eve Ensler
