= Aaron Hamburger =

American writer (born 1973)

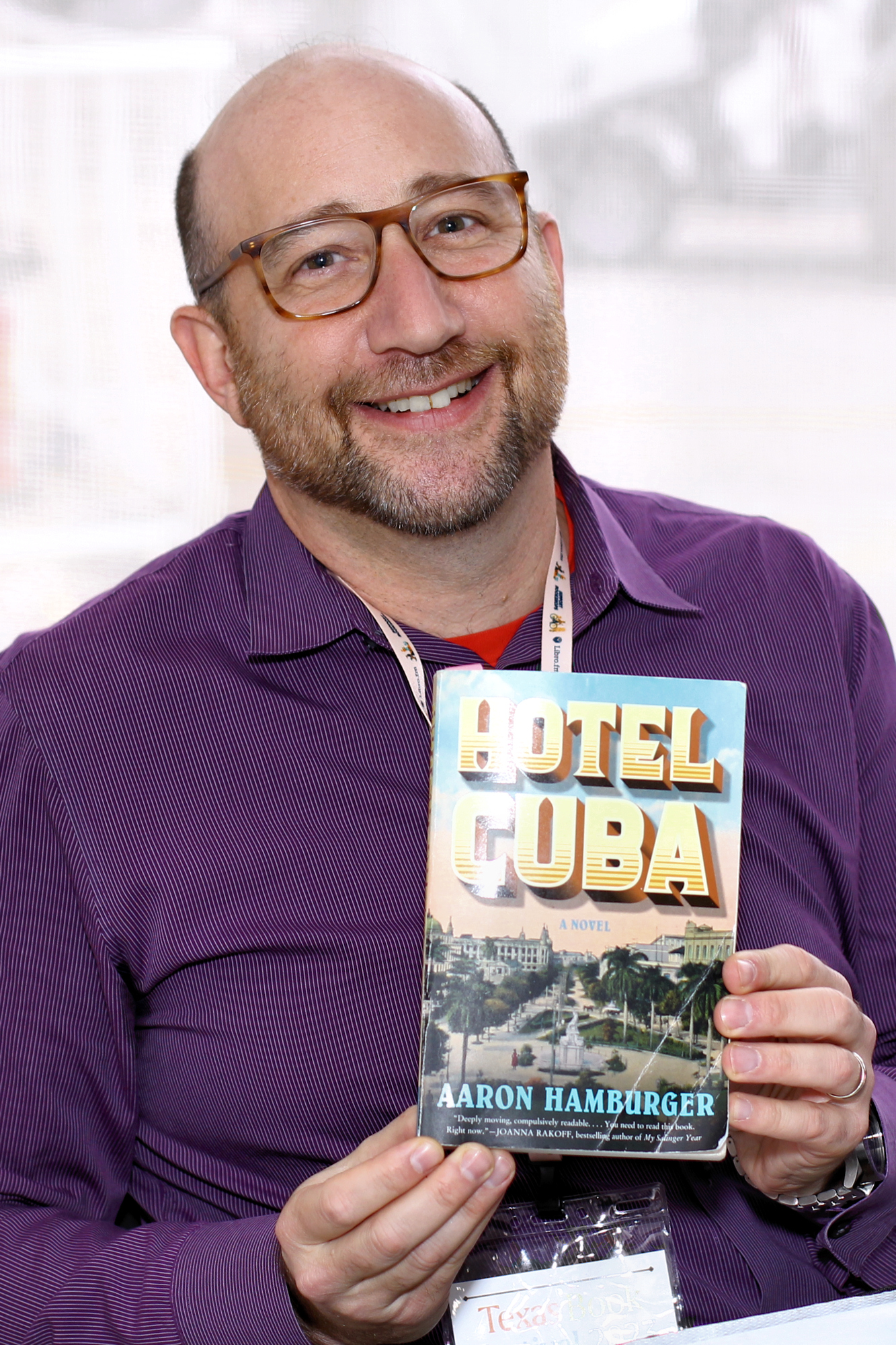
- Hamburger at the 2023 Texas Book Festival
- Born: 1973 (age 52–53); Detroit, Michigan, U.S.
- Education: University of Michigan (BA)
- Occupation: Writer

Aaron Hamburger (born 1973) is an American writer known for his short story collection The View from Stalin's Head (2004) and novels Faith for Beginners (2005), Nirvana Is Here (2019), and Hotel Cuba (2023).

Born in Detroit, Michigan, Hamburger went to college at the University of Michigan (BA 1995) and then spent a year abroad teaching English in Prague, Czech Republic, the setting for his first book of stories, primarily about the lives of expatriates after the end of the Cold War. The View from Stalin's Head was awarded the Rome Prize by the American Academy of Arts and Letters and the American Academy in Rome. His next book, Faith for Beginners, is a novel about a dysfunctional family vacation in Jerusalem, and was nominated for a Lambda Literary Award. His novel Nirvana Is Here was published in 2019 and won a Bronze Medal in the 2019 Forewords Indie Awards. His novel Hotel Cuba was published in 2023 and won the 2024 Bridge Book Award in American Fiction. He was awarded the 2023 Jim Duggins, PhD Outstanding Mid-Career Novelist Prize by Lambda Literary.

Hamburger's writing has appeared in The New York Times, The Washington Post, The Chicago Tribune, Tin House, O, the Oprah Magazine, Subtropics, Crazyhorse, Boulevard, Tablet, The Village Voice, Out, Poets and Writers, Details, Nerve, and Time Out New York.

He has won fellowships from the Civitella Ranieri Foundation, the DC Commission on the Arts and Humanities, and the Edward F. Albee Foundation as well as first place in the David J. Dornstein Contest for Young Jewish Writers. He has taught writing at Columbia University, George Washington University, the Stonecoast MFA Program (University of Southern Maine), and the American Language Institute (New York University).
