= Driving licence in the Republic of Ireland =

Driving Licence in Ireland; Ceadúnas Tiomána
- Irish Driving Licence
- Type: Driving licence
- Issued by: Ireland
- Purpose: Identification
- Expiration: Learner Permit: after 2 years Full Licence: after 10 years
- Cost: Learner Permits: €45; Full Licence Renewals: €65

In Ireland, a driving licence is an official document which authorises its holder to operate various types of motor vehicle on roads to which the public have access. Since 29 October 2013, they are issued by the National Driver Licence Service (NDLS). Based on the European driving licence standards, all the categories of licence available and the physical licence meet the 2006 EU standards.

== History ==
From 19 January 2013, new licences issued are similar in size and shape to a credit-card (85.6 × 53.98 mm) as stipulated in Directive 2006/126/EEC. It features the driver's name and date of birth, their photo, signature and any restrictions or endorsements such as the need to wear glasses and any penalty points accrued.

From January 2014, the NDLS started to issue an electronic driving licence containing all the information relating to the licence. This provides additional security and protection against fraud. The microchip enables the licence to be read by special card readers which are managed by the Road Safety Authority and are available to the Garda Síochána, however, not all of the categories on the new licence are obtainable. An oversight in production of the licence means that category B1 appears on the driving licence in Ireland but cannot be obtained.

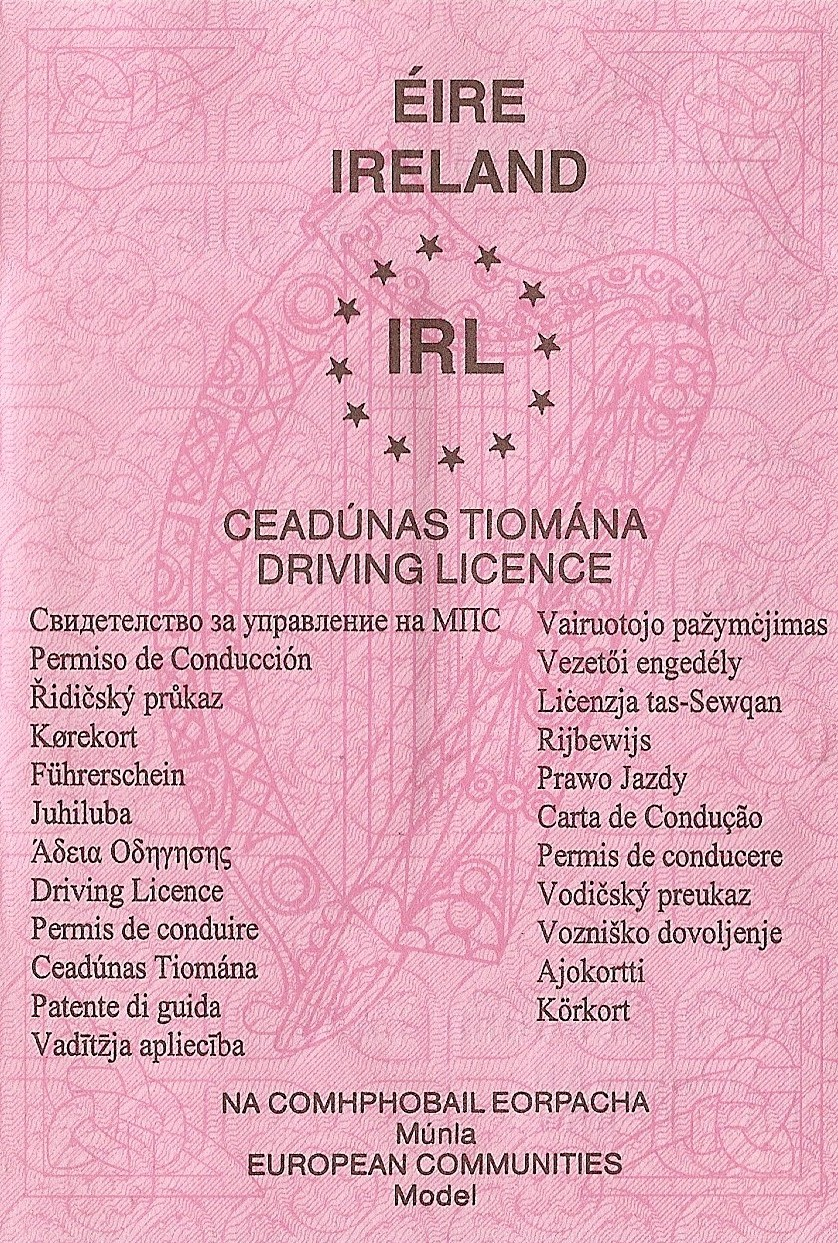
Former Irish Driving Licence

The old licence was based on the old European format, defined in Directive 91/439/EEC, as was used in other countries in the past. It consisted of a pink tri-fold paper document, laminated on one side. It contained a photo of the driver, their personal details and home address, and a listing of categories of vehicle they are licensed for, with any restrictions printed using a code format. The un-laminated side consisted of a section for any written-in endorsements as well as a page with the term 'Driving licence' or its equivalents in a large number of languages.

Both learner permits and the former provisional licences are identical in format to full licences, but green in colour. They do not carry the full translations list as they are not valid outside of the Republic of Ireland and are marked as such on the front. Once a driving test has been passed, all categories of driver with the exception of motorcycle drivers have no restrictions on road usage or vehicle type.

Prior to serious reforms in 2007, many people who drove never completed the process of receiving a full licence - 400,000 people held provisional licences in October 2007 when the new Learner Permit system was introduced. Serious crackdowns and a huge increase in testing facilities have brought this number down heavily.

The reason for the high number of people driving under a Provisional Licence under the old system was because a Provisional Licence holder could drive unaccompanied after obtaining their second Provisional Licence, and many drivers chose this route rather than going through the full testing process. This system was very unusual - most countries' provisional/learner licences require a fully qualified driver to accompany a learner.

== Driver theory test ==
The driver theory test is carried out by Prometric Ireland on behalf of the RSA.

Candidates get asked forty multiple choice questions. In order to pass the theory test, candidates must score at least 35/40. Anything scored under 35 is a fail and the test must be retaken.

== Learner Permit ==
Example of the learner permit issued in the Republic of Ireland.

(Provisional Licence) Obtaining a Learner Permit requires passing the afore-mentioned computerised theory test. Also required for the Learner Permit are: valid proof of address, valid proof of PPSN, valid photographic ID and Eyesight Report (where necessary). The Application Form for a Learner Permit D201 must be filled in and brought to the local NDLS office.

Those on Learner Permits for most categories of licence must not drive unaccompanied. No Learner Permit holders are allowed to drive on motorways and all must display red L-plates at all times, either on their vehicle or on a tabard if a motorcyclist.

== Driving licence categories ==
This is a list of the categories that can be found on a driving licence in the Republic of Ireland.

Note: The category B1 appears on the driving licence in Ireland but cannot be obtained as it does not actually exist there.

Category	Vehicle Type	Minimum Age
AM	Mopeds and Light quadricycles.	16
A1	Motorcycles with an engine capacity not exceeding 125 cubic centimetres, with a power rating not exceeding 11 kW and with a power-to-weight ratio not exceeding 0.1 kW/kg. Motor tricycles with a power rating not exceeding 15 kW.	16
A2	Motorcycles with a power rating not exceeding 35 kW, with a power to weight ratio not exceeding 0.2 kW/kg and not derived from a vehicle of more than double its power.	18
A	Motorcycles. Motor tricycles.	24 (Direct Access); 20 (Progressive Access)
A	Motor tricycles	21
B	Vehicles (other than motorcycles, mopeds, work vehicles or land tractors) having a MAM not exceeding 3,500 kg. having passenger accommodation for not more than 8 persons and where the MAM¹ of the trailer is not greater than 750 kg. or where the combined MAM of the towing vehicle and the trailer does not exceed 3,500 kg. Alternatively fuelled vehicles with a MAM exceeding 3,500 kg. but not exceeding 4,250 kg. for the transport of goods operating without a trailer by holders of a category B driving licence which was issued at least two years before, provided that the mass in excess of 3,500 kg. is due exclusively to the excess of mass of the propulsion system in relation to the propulsion system of a vehicle of the same dimensions, which is equipped with a conventional internal combustion engine with positive ignition or compression ignition, and provided that the cargo capacity is not increased in relation to the same vehicle. A licence with code 96 permits the combination of drawing vehicle and trailer where the MAM of the trailer may exceed 750 kg and where the MAM of the towing vehicle and trailer combined does not exceed 4,250 kg. Quadricycles (other than those covered by AM) are covered by this category.	17
BE	Combination of drawing vehicles in category B and trailer where the MAM of the trailer is not greater than 3,500 kg.	17
W	Work vehicles and land tractor with or without a trailer.	16
C	Vehicles (other than work vehicles or land tractors) having a MAM exceeding 3,500 kg, designed and constructed for the carriage of no more than eight passengers in addition to the driver and where the MAM of the trailer is not greater than 750 kg.	21 (without CPC); 18 (with CPC )
CE	Combination of drawing vehicles in category C and trailer where the MAM of the trailer is greater than 750 kg.	21 (without CPC); 18 (with CPC )
C1	Vehicles in category C having a MAM weight not exceeding 7,500 kg, designed and constructed for the carriage of no more than eight passengers in addition to the driver and where the MAM of the trailer is not greater than 750 kg	18
C1E	Combination of drawing vehicles in category C1 and trailer where the MAM of the trailer is greater than 750 kg and where the MAM of the drawing vehicle and trailer combined does not exceed 12,000 kg.; Combination of drawing vehicles in category B with trailer where the MAM of the trailer is greater than 3,500 kg and where the MAM of the drawing vehicle and trailer combined does not exceed 12,000 kg.	18
D	Vehicles designed and constructed for the carriage of more than eight passengers in addition to the driver and where the MAM of the trailer is not greater than 750 kg.	24 (without CPC); 21 (with CPC )
DE	Combination of drawing vehicles in category D and trailer where the MAM of the trailer is greater than 750 kg.	24 (without CPC); 21 (with CPC )
D1	Vehicles in category D designed and constructed for the carriage of not more than sixteen passengers in addition to the driver with a maximum length not exceeding 8 metres and where the MAM of the trailer is not greater than 750 kg.	21
D1E	Combination of drawing vehicles in category D1 and trailer where the MAM of the trailer is greater than 750 kg.	21

== Penalty points ==
Since 2002, Ireland, like other EU states, has operated a penalty points system for driving offences. If a driver accrues 12 points, their licence is revoked for (at least) 6 months.

== Gallery ==
Current Irish driving licence

Current Irish learner permit

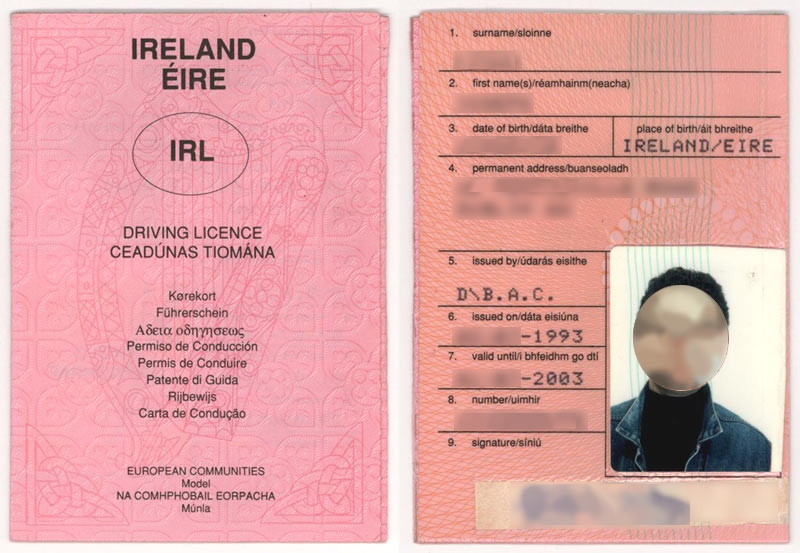
Former Irish driving licence (Replaced 2013)

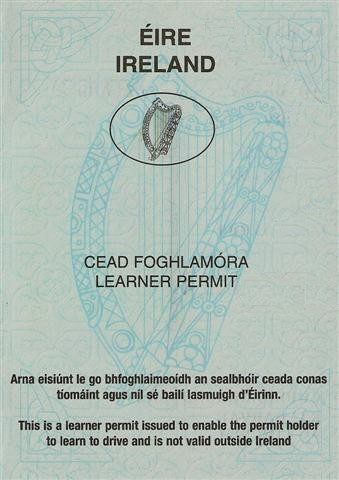
Former Irish learner's permit (Replaced 2013)

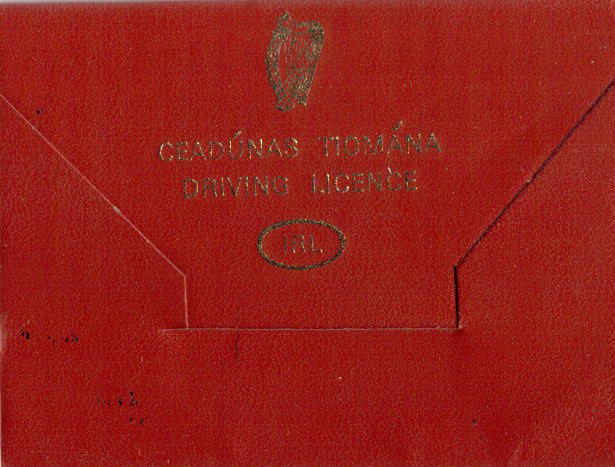
Old version Irish driving licence (1981)

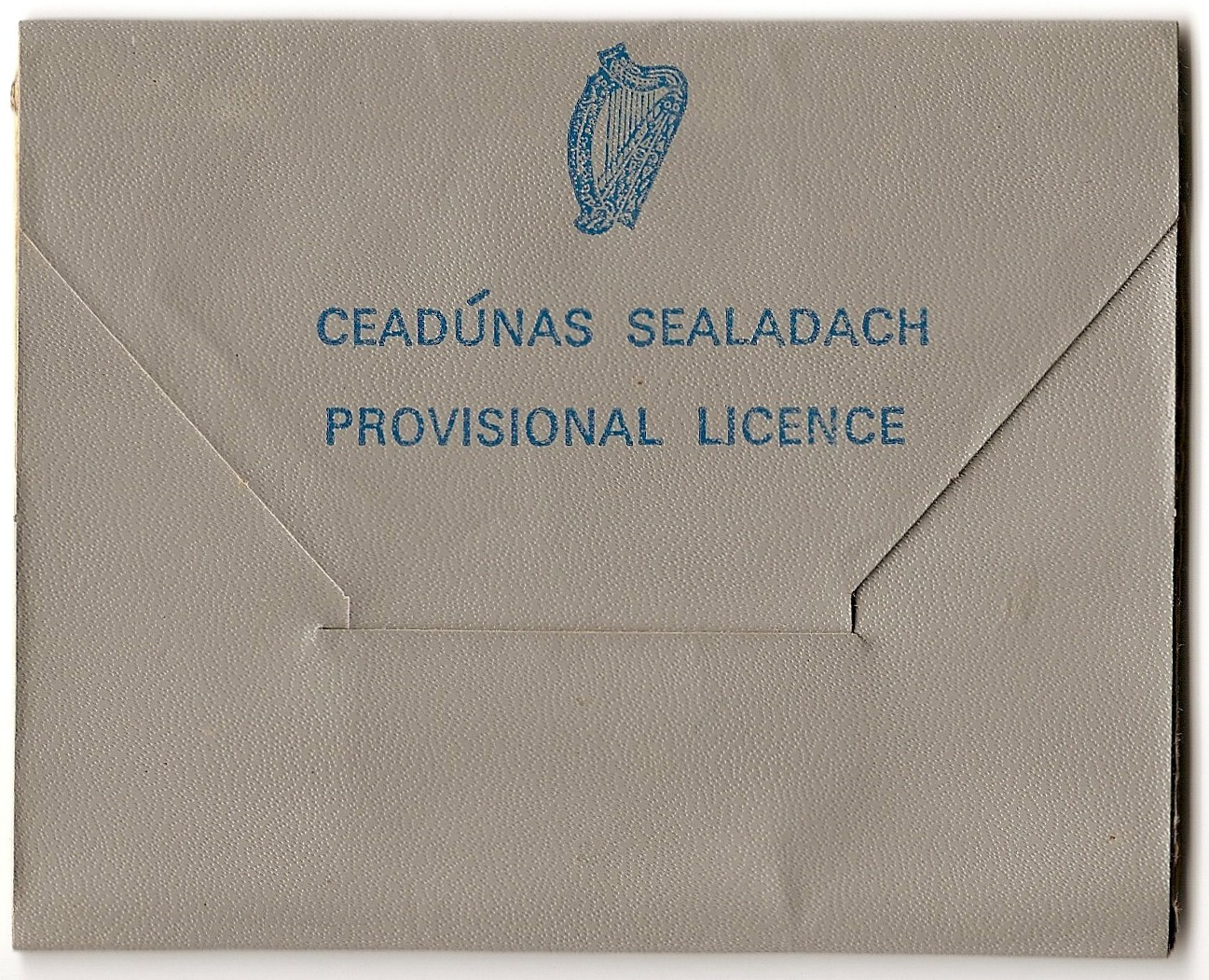
Old version Irish provisional driving licence (1976)

N plate that must be displayed by novice drivers in Ireland

== See also ==
- European driving licence
- For Northern Ireland see Driving licence in the United Kingdom
- Irish passport
- Prawo Jazdy (alleged criminal)
