= James "Kibo" Parry =

American Usenetter (born 1967)

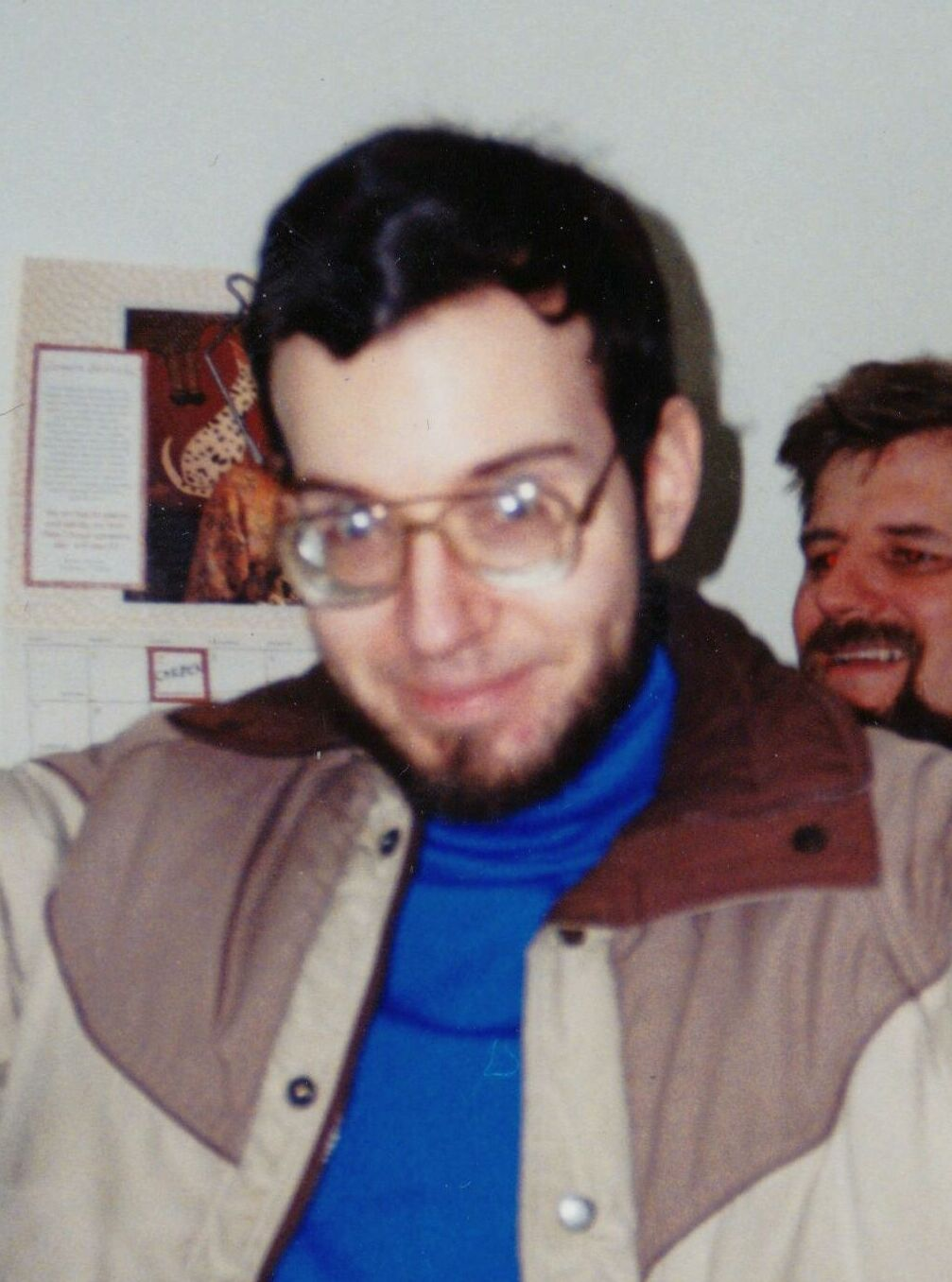
- Parry in 1993
- Born: James Parry; July 13, 1967 (age 59); Scotia, New York
- Other name: Kibo
- Education: Emerson College
- Occupation: Usenetter
- Website: kibo.com

James Parry (born July 13, 1967), commonly known by his nickname and username Kibo /ˈkaɪboʊ/, is a Usenetter known for his sense of humor, various surrealist net pranks, an absurdly long signature, and a machine-assisted knack for "kibozing": joining any thread in which "kibo" was mentioned. His exploits have earned him a multitude of enthusiasts, who celebrate him as the head deity of the parody religion "Kibology", centered on the humor newsgroup alt.religion.kibology.

== Background ==
James Parry grew up and lived in Scotia, New York. He showed early computing skills, such as being able to open up and reprogram ROM video game cartridges such as those for the Atari 2600, but was more interested in graphics and artistic pursuits. In this vein, he was initially a computer engineering major at Rensselaer Polytechnic Institute (RPI) in Troy, New York, but then moved to Boston, Massachusetts in 1990 and attended Emerson College, where he studied videography and graphic design. At that time, he also worked as a typeface designer and for the world.std.com internet service provider. He developed several fonts in use today. One of his better-known works is the typography for Philip K. Dick's novel Gather Yourselves Together.

== Growing fame ==
In the early 1990s, as public awareness grew of the Internet and Usenet, Parry received publicity, including a cover story in Wired magazine and mentions in Playboy and The Times. He became known on Usenet for grepping all occurrences of the term "Kibo"—whether intended to refer to Kibo himself or not—and replying, often in a fanciful manner. A typical exchange:

Mary Rose Campbell wrote:
>At CMU, we also have something called Gray Matter in the center of Skibo
>(our student union substitute).  It's a bunch of shapes, walls, holes,
>and steps covered with the same dark gray carpet that's on the floor.
>It looks like a giant cat toy.

Actually, it's a life-size model of S. Kibo himself, my great great
grand-uncle.  This was before he evolved past the 'giant metazoic
amoeba' stage a few aeons ago.  Now he's a trilobite.
                                                         – K.

This practice of searching Usenet for mentions of one's own name became known as kibozing. In 2006, Parry estimated that he had posted "an average of 20 articles a week to alt.religion.kibology during the past 15 years, probably about 500 words of original content per article, that's... seven point eight mmmmillion [sic] words. Equivalent to about 100 books."

He is perhaps best known on Usenet for his famous (or infamous) "Happynet Proclamation" (1992), circulated to many newsgroups, some absurdly unrelated, which satirized the endless flamewars on the network, with Parry posing as a godlike being issuing an edict full of in-jokes and humor targets that claimed to unify all news into one glorious totality, "happynet". In the article, Kibo claimed that:

********* HAPPYNET: THE NET THAT'S HAPPIER THAN YOU! *********

UNDER THE AUSPICES OF THE ALL-WISE LEADER KIBO,
THE NEW NETWORK SHALL BE ORGANIZED THUSLY:

Three hierarchies encompassing ALL HUMAN DISCOURSE.

=>  nonbozo.*

=>  bozo.*

=>  megabozo.*

Existing groups will be moved into the new organization scheme, resulting
in nonbozo.news.announce.newusers, bozo.rec.pets, megabozo.talk.bizarre,
nonbozo.comp.virus, bozo.alt.sex, megabozo.alt.fan.lemurs, bozo.postmodern,
etc., as determined by scientific measurements of the bozosity of the
groups, measured by Leader Kibo's Council On Scientific Bozosity and the
faculty of Rensselaer Polytechnic Institute (Troy, NY), world leaders in
bozosity assessment.

It is estimated that the breakdown will be thus:

 1.0000%  nonbozo.*
90.0000%  bozo.*
 9.0000%  megabozo.*     (Computations courtesy of Bell Labs)

Bozo.* will, of course, be subdivided logically:  bozo.nerd.*, bozo.tv.*,
bozo.inane.*, bozo.boring.*, bozo.sex.*, bozo.argue.*.

=== Kibology and alt.religion.kibology ===
Kibology is a parody religion created by Parry, the central figure. Practitioners of Kibology are called 'Kibologists' or (sometimes more disdainfully) 'Kibozos'. Parry began Kibology about 1989. In its early Usenet days, it was centered in the newsgroups talk.bizarre and the Church of the SubGenius group "alt.slack", until the creation of its own Usenet group, alt.religion.kibology in late 1991. The religious satire of Kibology shares tenets of other parody religions, including similar concepts to the Flying Spaghetti Monster and Invisible Pink Unicorn. The alt.religion.kibology newsgroup remained active through the 1990s, with gradually less emphasis on the joke religion and more satirizing popular culture and internet culture as a sort of online comedy writer's collaboration room. The group collectively invented and developed the sport of 'trolling,' with Kibo writing rules and a points system for trolling other Usenet newsgroups. Other popular regular contributors kept the group active even during "Kibo"'s periodic absences from Usenet. In 2003, the group spawned a band, Interröbang Cartel, which by 2011 had written and recorded more than 80 songs.

== Hallmarks ==
The term "bozo" and related jokes like the physics particle the "bozon" were Parry hallmarks. Revisions of the Manifesto were published in 1994 and 1998. HappyWeb was introduced in 1999.

In 1992, at age 25 (ten years younger than the constitutional minimum age for election), he launched a spoof campaign for President of the United States.
