= Dinkoism =

Indian religion and social movement

- Dinkan, the supermouse God of Dinkoism
- Scripture: Dinka Puranam; Balamangalam
- Official website: Dinkoism on Facebook

Dinkoism (/ˈdɪnkɔɪzəm/), the Dinkoist religion, or Dinkadharma and Dinkamatham is a parody religion and social movement that emerged and evolved on social networks organized by independent welfare groups in the Indian state of Kerala. Adherents describe Dinkoism as a genuine religion.

== History ==
According to a report in India Today, Dinkoism was established in 2008 in Kerala by a group of rationalists with the intention of ridiculing "the absurdity of blind religious faith." The community planned to become politically active. A report in The New Indian Express said Dinkoism is gaining members through Facebook. The BBC described Dinkoism in 2016 as an atheist movement with significant growth on social media.

== Description ==
The religion purports to worship Dinkan, a comic book character. Dinkoists celebrate the character—a superhero mouse that appeared in 1983 in defunct Malayalam-language children's magazine Balamangalam—as their God for the purpose of exposing superstitions, fallacies, and practices of traditional religions.

== Events and protests ==
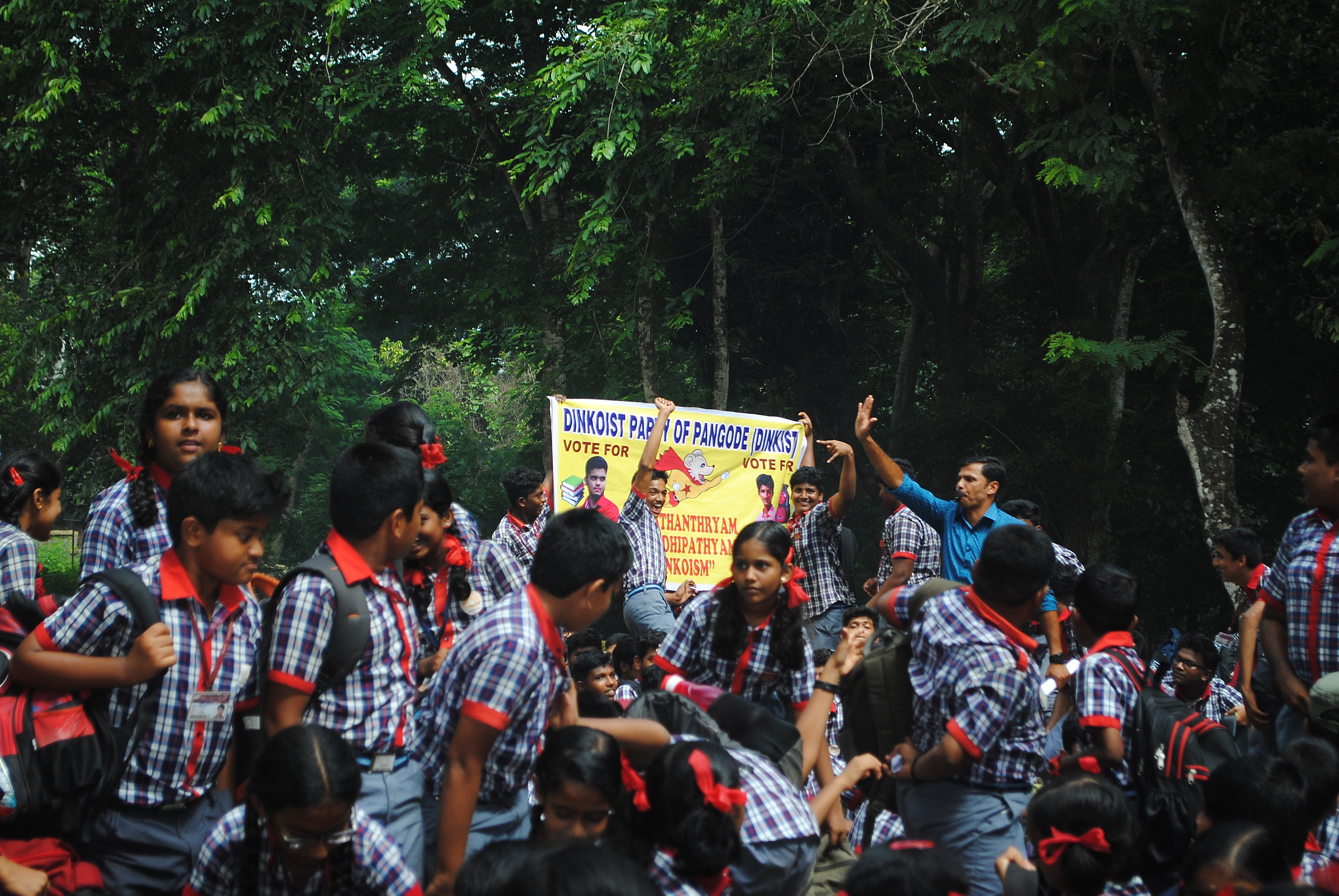
A group of school children campaigning for a school election under a party formed on basis of belief in Dinkoism.

The concept of Dinkoism has spread through social media but the movement has also organised protest events. On January 30, 2016, a group of Dinkoists, under the banner of Mooshikasena (Rat Army) held a mock protest in front of Dhe Puttu restaurant owned by popular actor Dileep alleging his upcoming film Professor Dinkan hurt their religious sentiments, mocking similar protests happening worldwide.

Earlier Dinkoism was in news when an expatriate Dinkoist living in California obtained a license plate with the inscription "DINKAN" for his car, out of his devotion for Dinkan. In 2016, J. Devika wrote an article about the concept of Dinkoism and the logic of the market.

Dinkan's image have been used in various protests. In 2026, Dinkan posters were spotted in NEET paper leak protests.

== Conferences ==
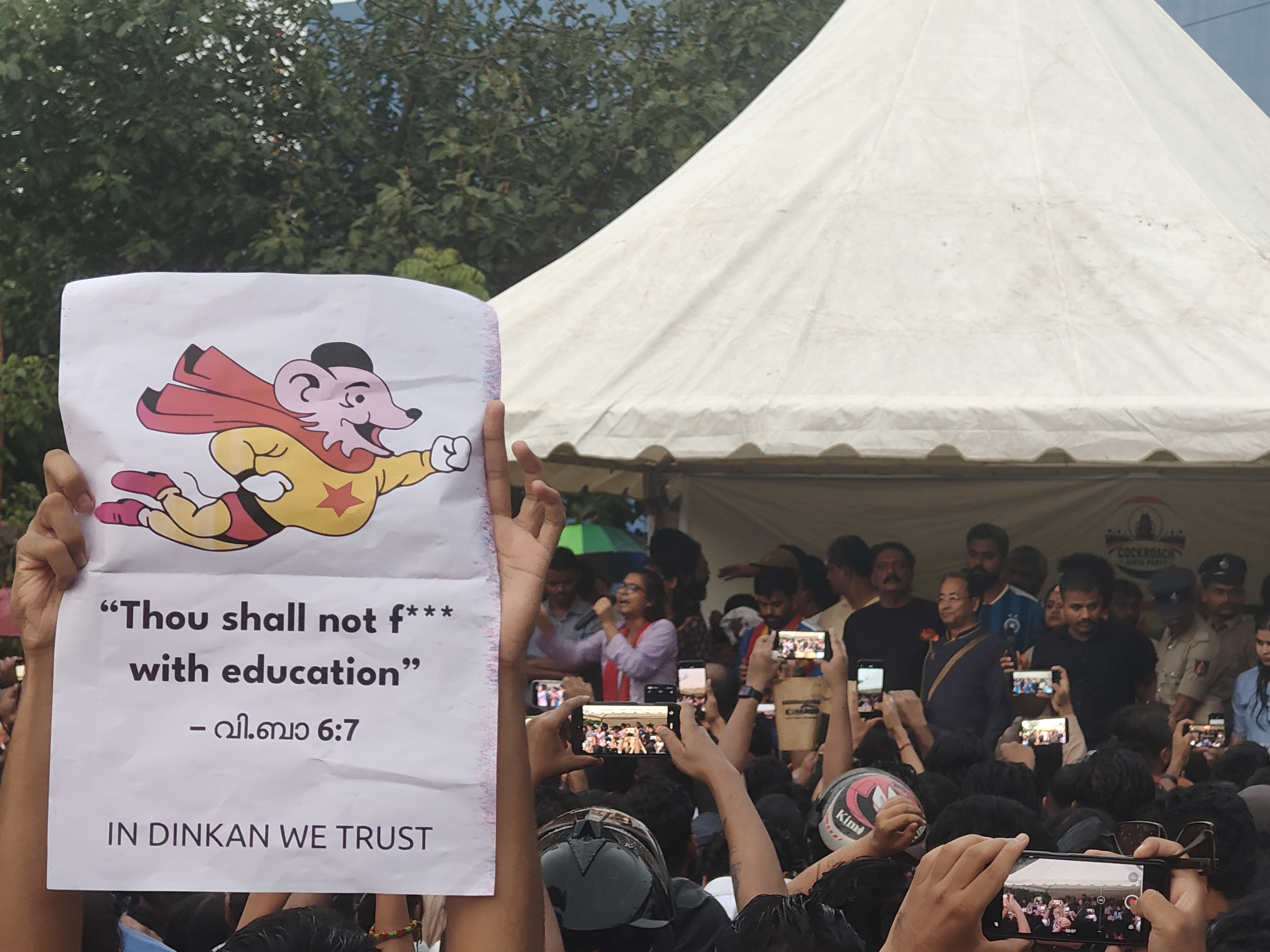
Dinkan poster with a reference to 6-7 in NEET paper leak protest organized by satirical Cockroach Janta Party.

Dinkoists of Kozhikode organised a conference at the Sports Council Hall, Mananchira on March 20, 2016. They organised a variety of entertainments with a theme of tapioca. E. A. Jabbar, a prominent rationalist, endorsed Dinkoism.

In April 2016, 25,000 Dinkoists were expected to gather for a convention called a "Dinkamatha Maha Sammelanam" to "present their rights as a minority community." Dinkoists have received threatening messages as well as opposition from believers of other religions.

== See also ==
- Church of the SubGenius
- Discordianism
- Dudeism
- Evolution as fact and theory
- Existence of God
- Fideism
- Flying Spaghetti Monster
- Intelligent falling
- Invisible Pink Unicorn
- Mighty Mouse
- Out Campaign
- Parody religion
- Reductio ad absurdum
- Religious satire
- Theological noncognitivism
