= Dinka (disambiguation) =

The Dinka are an East African ethnic group.

Dinka may also refer to:

- Dinka language, a group of languages spoken by the Dinka people
  - Dinka alphabet, the alphabet in which the Dinka language is written
- Dinka (grape), a Hungarian wine grape
- Dinka (DJ), a Swiss DJ
- Dinka or Dinkan, fictional comics character and central deity of the parody Indian religion Dinkamatham or Dinkoism

== People with the surname and given name ==
- Balázs Dinka (born 1976), Hungarian footballer
- Berhanu Dinka (1935–2013), Ethiopian diplomat and economist
- Tesfaye Dinka (1939–2016), Ethiopian politician and Prime Minister of Ethiopia
- Dinka Džubur, Croatian-born Australian actress, model and filmmaker
- Dinka Kulić (born 1997), Croatian volleyball player

== See also ==
- Donka (disambiguation)
