= Dinko =

Dinko is a South Slavic masculine given name. In Croatian it is a diminutive of Dominko, a variant of Dominik. It is also found in Bulgaria.

Notable people with the name include:

- Dinko Dermendzhiev (1941–2019), Bulgarian football player and manager
- Dinko Jukić (born 1989), Croatian-born Austrian swimmer
- Dinko Mulić (born 1983), Croatian whitewater kayaker
- Dinko Ranjina (1536–1607), Croatian poet from the Republic of Ragusa (Dubrovnik)
- Dinko Šakić (1921–2008), Croatian fascist
- Dinko Šimunović (1853–1933), Croatian writer
- Dinko Tomašić (1902–1975), Croatian sociologist and academic
- Dinko Trinajstić (1858–1939), Croatian lawyer and politician
- Dinko Zlatarić (1558–1613), Croatian poet and translator from Dubrovnik

== See also ==
- Dinka (given name), feminine form
