= HCSM =

HCSM may refer to:

- AGM-88F HCSM, a variant of the AGM-88 HARM missile.
- Health care sharing ministry – Organizations in the United States in which health care costs are shared
- HCSM, the flight information region ICAO code for Mogadishu, Somalia
- Human Capital Management System, a type of human resources software
