= Baconism =

Baconism may refer to:

- The philosophy of Francis Bacon, an English philosopher
- The United Church of Bacon, a parody religion
