= Dingan =

Dingan or Ding'an may refer to:

- Dingane kaSenzangakhona (1795–1840), Zulu chief who became king in 1828
- Jeongan (定安國; 938–986), a historical state in Manchuria
- Ding'an County (定安县), Hainan, China
- Ding'an dialect of Hainanese
- Princess Ding'an (定安公主), or Princess Taihe, princess of the Tang dynasty of China
- Ding'an, Tianlin County (定安镇), town in Guangxi, China
- Dinkan, a cartoon lead character
