= Our Lady of Perpetual Exemption =

2015 US satirical church

- The logo on the original website
- Formation: August 16, 2015
- Founder: John Oliver
- Dissolved: September 13, 2015
- Type: Parody religion
- Headquarters: CBS Broadcast Center, New York City, New York, US
- Megareverend and CEO: John Oliver
- Website: ourladyofperpetualexemption.com; archive

Our Lady of Perpetual Exemption was a legally recognized parody religion in the United States established by the comedian and satirist John Oliver. The church was announced on August 16, 2015, in an episode of the television program Last Week Tonight with John Oliver. Its purpose was to highlight and criticize televangelists, such as Kenneth Copeland and Robert Tilton, whom Oliver argued used television broadcasts of Christian church services for private gain. Oliver also established Our Lady of Perpetual Exemption to draw attention to the tax-exempt status given to churches.

During his show on September 13, 2015, Oliver announced that the church had received "thousands of dollars" and a variety of other items from viewers, and announced that the Church would be shutting down. The segments and later spinoff segments featured the comedian Rachel Dratch as Oliver's fictional wife, Wanda Jo. All donations were given to Doctors Without Borders.

Oliver created two spinoffs of the church in later segments. In April 2018, Oliver founded Our Lady of Choosing Choice, which owned the van labeled "Vanned Parenthood" (a reference to Planned Parenthood), for a segment about crisis pregnancy centers. In June 2021, Oliver set up a church in Florida called Our Lady of Perpetual Health, which owned the health care sharing ministry "JohnnyCare", satirizing the lack of regulations on such ministries.

== Creation ==
External videos
- Televangelists: Last Week Tonight with John Oliver (HBO) on YouTube

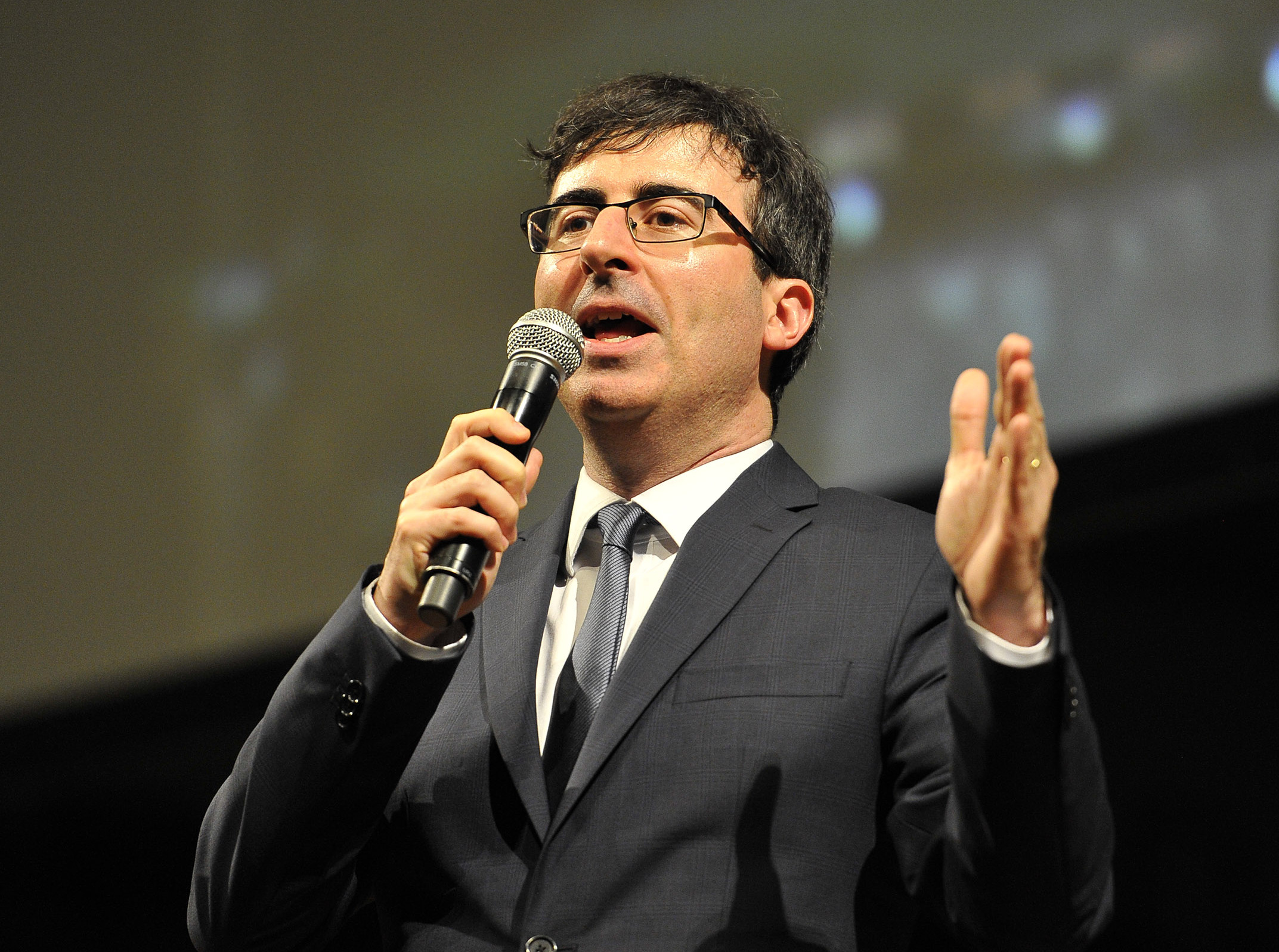
Oliver, "Megareverend and CEO" of the church, in 2014

On August 16, 2015, Last Week Tonight with John Oliver broadcast a segment about televangelism, the practice of using television broadcasts for Christian church services. In the segment, Oliver criticized televangelists like Kenneth Copeland and Robert Tilton for using donations from their programs to pay for private luxuries and pointed out that such donations were tax-exempt under the U.S. Internal Revenue Service's (IRS) regulations. The host opined that part of this was due to the IRS's lax requirements; he pointed out that only three churches were audited in 2013 and 2014. Oliver established Our Lady of Perpetual Exemption partly to demonstrate the lack of legal requirements to establish a tax-exempt religious organization and to illustrate the "disturbingly easy" process. The host explained that he was able to found the church due to "vague" legal restrictions. He chose his New York City studio for the church's official location, but registered the nonprofit organization in Texas. During the satirical infomercial segment of the episode, the comedian Rachel Dratch appeared as John Oliver's fictional wife Wanda Jo Oliver; she later reprised the role in episodes featuring spinoffs of the church and in Last Week Tonight's 2019 segment about psychics. The "megachurch" used a toll-free phone number to permit callers to donate to the church, and said that all monetary donations would be redistributed to the charitable relief organization Doctors Without Borders upon the church's dissolution.

Oliver criticized the practices used by televangelists for donations, which included promising that donations and prayer would cure sickness or that donations would get rid of credit card debt. In his broadcast on August 16, the host revealed letters of his months-long correspondence with Tilton, in which he initially sent $20 to Tilton's church and received a letter back asking for more in donations; by the end of the correspondence, he had received a total of 26 letters and donated $319. Oliver criticized pastors such as Tilton, Copeland and his wife Gloria, Creflo Dollar, and others for using the IRS's religious tax breaks for personal luxuries.

== Response and dissolution ==
1800THISISLEGAL Phone Message
This message played when viewers called the number mentioned during the segment

Oliver later announced that in response to the episode, viewers of Last Week Tonight had sent in "70 thousand dollars in singles", international currency, a check for $65 billion, and different packages of seeds, including semen (in reference to the "seed faith" gospel the show was parodying). Callers to the toll-free number heard a pre-recorded message from Oliver demanding donations.

A week after the announcement of the church's creation, Oliver devoted a short segment of his show to the donations the church had received, which included money from around the world. Oliver said he had received "thousands of envelopes with thousands of dollars" from donors, displaying several US Post Office containers full of mail. Oliver told viewers that the more money they sent in, the more "blessings" would be returned to them, adding that "that is still something I'm—amazingly—legally allowed to say".

On September 13, 2015, Oliver announced on Last Week Tonight that he was closing Our Lady of Perpetual Exemption. A message on the church's website stated: "We're also not closing down because you all kept sending us actual seeds, even though we explicitly told you not to. We're closing because multiple people sent us sperm through the mail." Upon the church's dissolution, Oliver announced that the tens of thousands of dollars received would be donated to Doctors Without Borders and mockingly said that "if you want to send money to a fake church, send it to Scientology".

== Reception ==
Matt Wilstein, writing in Mediaite, compared Oliver's stunt to the comedian Stephen Colbert's "Colbert Super PAC", which Colbert used to test the limits of the 2010 Supreme Court decision in Citizens United v. FEC. Many reviewers agreed with Oliver's characterization of televangelists as "frauds". Some reviewers found that Oliver's criticism of the IRS was incomplete and useless; others criticized Oliver's failure to discuss the long history of tax-exempt status for churches. Steve Thorngate, writing in The Christian Century, suggested that the question of religious tax exemption was more difficult and nuanced than Oliver portrayed, and not a simple matter of government regulation. However, Thorngate agreed that Oliver's exposure and criticism of televangelists was accurate. After the segment aired, the IRS was pressured to investigate televangelists and their use of tax-exempt status. The IRS and the televangelists discussed in the segment did not publicly comment.

== Spinoffs ==
External videos
- Crisis Pregnancy Centers: Last Week Tonight with John Oliver (HBO) on YouTube
- Health Care Sharing Ministries: Last Week Tonight with John Oliver (HBO) on YouTube

On April 8, 2018, Last Week Tonight broadcast a segment about crisis pregnancy centers (CPCs), which dissuade pregnant women from getting abortions, often through misinformation. Oliver highlighted an image of a van that would park outside centers to advertise free ultrasounds. Oliver filed paperwork in New York to start the nonprofit Our Lady of Choosing Choice, which owned the CPC van labeled "Vanned Parenthood" (a reference to Planned Parenthood). Oliver announced the van at the end of the segment on CPCs with Rachel Dratch as Wanda Jo, who made multiple incorrect medical claims to point out the ability CPC workers have to misinform patients. Oliver finished the segment by saying: "This is all perfectly legal and there is absolutely nothing stopping us from parking outside an abortion clinic tonight and haranguing people in the morning." Pro-life organizations and CPC operators criticized the segment for presenting a "one-sided" argument, with one CPC founder calling it a "hate piece".

On June 27, 2021, Last Week Tonight broadcast a segment about health care sharing ministries (HCSMs), which are religion-based organizations where members' premiums directly pay the healthcare costs of other members, exempt from tax. Oliver discussed the lack of regulation on HCSMs, allowing the organizations to deny coverage for anything, and advocated for states to pass laws mandating that HCSMs disclose their practices and properly allocate funds. In 2018, Florida eased restrictions on HCSMs, changing the criteria from mandating that an HCSM have people of the same religion to having people who "share a common set of ethical or religious beliefs". Due to the lax requirements, Oliver founded the church Our Lady of Perpetual Health, which owned the HCSM "JohnnyCare". Oliver announced the new organization in an informercial at the end of the Last Week Tonight segment about HCSMs, bringing back Rachel Dratch as Wanda Jo. Oliver stated that 5,000 Florida residents could sign up for a $1.99 fee and receive a JohnnyCare-branded set of bandages in return.

== See also ==
- Free church – Christian denomination independent of the state
- Religion and politics in the United States
- Religious satire – Satire referring to religious beliefs
