= Parody religion =

Constructed mock religion

Logo for the Church of the Flying Spaghetti Monster, a parody religion

A parody religion or mock religion is a belief system that challenges the spiritual convictions of others, often through humor, satire, or burlesque (literary ridicule). Often constructed to achieve a specific purpose related to another belief system, a parody religion can be a parody of several religions, sects, gurus, cults, or new religious movements at the same time, or even a parody of no particular religion – instead parodying the concept of religious belief itself. Some parody religions emphasise having fun; the new faith may serve as a convenient excuse for pleasant social interaction among the like-minded.

One approach of parody religions aims to highlight deficiencies in particular pro-religious arguments – following the logic that if a given argument can also be used to support a clear parody, then the original argument is clearly flawed. This can be done through fictional religions found in many works of fiction - one example of this can be the Bokononism from the novel Cat's Cradle (1963) by Kurt Vonnegut. Another example of this is the Church of the Flying Spaghetti Monster, which parodies the demand for equal time employed by intelligent design and creationism.

Occasionally, a parody religion may offer ordination by mail or online at a nominal fee, seeking equal recognition for its clergy/officiants – under freedom of religion provisions, including the 1st and 14th amendments to the United States Constitution – to legally solemnise marriages. Parody religions also have sought the same reasonable accommodation legally afforded to mainstream religions, including religious-specific garb or headgear. A U.S. federal court ruled in 2016 that the Church of the Flying Spaghetti Monster ("Pastafarianism") is not a religion, but Pastafarianism or "The Church of the Latter-Day Dude" (Dudeism) have been accommodated to some extent by a few U.S. states and by some other countries.

Several religions that are considered as parody religions have several relatively serious followers who embrace the perceived absurdity of these religions as spiritually significant, a decidedly post-modern approach to religion. Since 2005, scholars of new religious movements have come to consider Discordianism as having a "complex and subtle religious system", concluding that "Discordianism can no longer be considered a purely parodic religion."

== List of notable parody religions ==
=== Parodies of particular beliefs ===
The Invisible Pink Unicorn is a parody religion used to satirize theistic beliefs. The Invisible Pink Unicorn is paradoxically both invisible and pink.

The following were created as parodies of particular religious beliefs:

Religion	Description	Notes
Eventualism	A satire on Scientology-like religions which appeared in the movie Schizopolis	
Invisible Pink Unicorn	A parody of theist definitions of God. It also highlights the arbitrary and unfalsifiable nature of religious belief, in a similar way to Russell's teapot.	
Kibology	A humorous Usenet-based satire of religion	
Landover Baptist Church	A satiric parody of Fundamentalist Christianity.	
Last Thursdayism	A joke version of omphalism that argues that the universe was created last Thursday, created to demonstrate problems with unfalsifiable beliefs, and the variant Next Wednesdayism inspired by John Landis's running movie gag See You Next Wednesday.	
Pastafarianism, or the Church of the Flying Spaghetti Monster	The most famous example of religious parody. A parody of intelligent design, creationism, and religion in general, as a modern version of Russell's teapot.	
Tarvuism	A spoof religion that British comedians Peter Serafinowicz and Robert Popper invented for the television show Look Around You that parodied instructional religious videos such as those of Scientologists and Christians.	
First Church of the Last Laugh	The spoof religion behind the annual Saint Stupid's Day Parade in San Francisco.	

=== Post-modern religions ===
The following post-modern religions may be seen as elaborate parodies of already-existent religions:

Religion	Description	Notes
The All-Joking, All-Drunken Synod of Fools and Jesters	A social club founded by Peter I of Russia. It often got into controversies for mocking the church.	
Bokononism	A fictional religion from Kurt Vonnegut's novel Cat's Cradle, which promotes harmless comforting lies called foma. Its principal text, The Books of Bokonon, is a parody of the New Testament. See also the Church of God the Utterly Indifferent in Vonnegut's The Sirens of Titan.	
Church of Euthanasia	The Church of Euthanasia is a "non-profit educational foundation devoted to restoring balance between Humans and the remaining species on Earth." The Church uses sermons, music, culture jamming, publicity stunts, and direct action to highlight Earth's unsustainable population. The Church is notorious for its conflicts with pro-life Christian activists.	
Church of the SubGenius	Founded in 1979. Often regarded as a parody of religion in general, with elements of fundamentalist Christianity, Zen, Scientology, new-age cults, pop-psychology, and motivational sales techniques amongst others, it has become a movement in its own right, inspiring several books, art exhibits, rock albums, conventions, and novelty items.	
The Cult of Kek	An internet religion associated with 4chan's /pol/, the far-right movement known as the "alt-right", and online supporters of 45th and 47th U.S. president, Donald Trump. Adherents satirically worship a cartoon frog called "Pepe" as the reincarnation of the Egyptian deity Kek, a harbinger of chaos and destruction.	
Dudeism	A religion based on the 1998 film The Big Lebowski, in which the main character, known as "the Dude", is revered as a guru. The adherents consider the religion a modern form of Taoism.	
Discordianism	It is based on the book 1965 Principia Discordia. Its principal deity is the goddess of chaos Discordia (Greek Eris). It is variously defined as a religion, philosophy, social commentary, or parody religion. There is some discourse as to whether Discordianism should be regarded as a parody religion, and if so, to what degree.	
Dinkoism	Dinkoism is a parody religion that places Dinkan, a comic character from Malayalam children's magazine Balamangalam, as the one true god and the creator of the universe. It is very similar to Pastafarianism, which worships the Flying Spaghetti Monster. Dinkoism was organized by some independent social welfare groups of Kerala, India as a means to mock blind faith and creatively criticise religious intolerance. It had its origins on social media. Its principal deity is also Dinkan.	
Gadgetology	Founded in Russia around 2010 in Nizhny Novgorod, this religion venerates the cartoon character Gadget Hackwrench from the syndicated Disney animated cartoon series Chip 'n Dale: Rescue Rangers. The religion has formed three non-exclusive currents: traditionalist, progressivist, and apocalyptic.	
Googlism	A satirical church which advocates naming the search engine Google a god; due to nine perceived similarities between it and the common definitions of what makes a deity.	
Igreja Evangélica Pica das Galáxias ("Dick of Galaxies Evangelical Church")	Originated in Brazil, it is a satirical parody of Brazilian evangelical churches. The leader of the "church" is the self-proclaimed Apostle Arnaldo (who had the titles of "pastor" and "bishop" and intends to have the title of "vice-god"). Arnaldo is a former member of the Reborn in Christ Church who left the religious organization due to allegations of money laundering against the church's leadership and created his own "church" on YouTube as a form of humorous criticism of evangelical churches in Brazil. In May 2021, his YouTube channel had 964,000 subscribers. On May 27, 2018, Arnaldo was interviewed by Danilo Gentili on the TV show The Noite com Danilo Gentili on SBT.	
Iglesia Maradoniana ("Church of Maradona")	It was formed by an Argentine group of fans of the late association football player Diego Armando Maradona. The adherents baptize themselves by slapping a football, which is a reference to the 1986 "Hand of God" goal.	
Jediism	In 2001, following an internet campaign, the fictional Star Wars "religion" of the Jedi became a parody religion in several Commonwealth countries as 1.5% of the New Zealand, 0.4% of the Australia and 0.7% of the UK population stated their religion as Jedi in the official census (see Jedi census).	
Kopimism	An internet-based religion based on the belief that file sharing is a sacred virtue which must remain protected. It was given recognition by the Swedish government in January 2012. It was founded by a philosophy student, Isak Gerson.	
Matrixism, or the Path of the One	A new religious movement inspired by the 1999 movie The Matrix. It appeared online in 2004. The adherents claim belief in a multilayered subjective reality and await the return of their prophet, the One.	
Neo-American Church	Psychedelian religion (LSD is a sacrament) which combines absurdism with legitimate solipsistic nihilism, but with some satirical elements (clergy are called Boo-Hoos, the church symbol is a three-eyed toad). Founder Arthur Kleps declared that one purpose of the church is to show that all religions are invented and silly.	
Temple of the Great Naked Mole Rat	The official religion of the micronation of Hole In Yardia, which holds the Great Naked Mole Rat as its central ruler.	
Order of Brothelyngham	A mid-14th century fake religious order in the city of Exeter, Devon.	
Our Lady of Perpetual Exemption	A religious movement for Last Week Tonight with John Oliver to satirize prosperity theology and the way the IRS deals with churches.	
Silinism	The official religion of the micronation of the Aerican Empire, which holds a giant penguin named Forsteri as its central figure.	
Sisters of Perpetual Indulgence	A drag performance group that lampoons religion to raise awareness for mostly LGBT causes.	
United Church of Bacon	Founded in 2010 in Las Vegas to protest discrimination against nonbelievers, it had 25,000 members in 2020.	
Zone Theory	A parody of religion and self-help books by comedy duo Tim & Eric.	

== Aspects ==
=== Beliefs ===
Parody religions are often created to satirize or mock established religions, and as such, their beliefs often reflect this satirical or humorous tone. Parody religions may also use their beliefs as a means of commenting on societal issues or political ideologies. The Church of the SubGenius, for instance, pokes fun at organized religion and American culture through its parodic depiction of a "mock religion" that celebrates slackness and absurdity. Other parody religions target specific religions, sects, or cults and craft their beliefs to mock those of the religion they are targeting.

One common belief found in many parody religions is the rejection of dogma and religious authority. Parody religions often portray themselves as free-thinking and open-minded, rejecting the idea of blind faith and instead encouraging critical thinking and skepticism.

Parody religions may also incorporate elements of pop culture or science fiction into their beliefs. For example, The Church of the Flying Spaghetti Monster, a parody religion that originated in response to the teaching of intelligent design in schools, posits that a flying spaghetti monster created the universe. Similarly, the Jediism movement, which began as a parody religion but has since become more serious, is based on the beliefs and practices of the Jedi Order from the Star Wars franchise.

=== Practices ===
Similar to many other religions, the practices of parody religions can include rituals, sermons, meditation, prayer, commemoration of a deity or god, sacrifices, parades, festivals, holidays, initiations, marital ceremonies, religious music & art, dance, public service, or other aspects of human culture.

Parody religions often use their practices as a way to further satirize or critique established religious practices, or as a way to create a sense of community and belonging among their followers. Parody religions may also use their practices to highlight societal issues or political ideologies.

One common practice found in many parody religions is the use of humor and satire in religious ceremonies and rituals. The Church of the Flying Spaghetti Monster, for example, often includes a "noodle mass" in which followers consume spaghetti and meatballs as a form of communion. The Church of the SubGenius also uses humor in its ceremonies, with rituals that include mock baptisms and the "slack off" ritual in which followers are encouraged to relax and do nothing.

Parody religions may also incorporate elements of pop culture or science fiction into their practices. The Jediism movement, for instance, practices lightsaber training and meditation, inspired by the Jedi Order from the Star Wars franchise. The Church of the Latter-Day Dude, a parody religion based on the character from the film "The Big Lebowski" practices "dudeist" philosophy and encourages followers to take it easy and "abide."

In addition to these unique practices, many parody religions also incorporate elements of more traditional religions into their practices. The Church of the SubGenius, for instance, uses elements of Christianity, Hinduism, and other religions in its rituals and iconography.

=== Social organization ===
Parody religions often have unique social structures and organizations that reflect their satirical or humorous tone. Parody religions may also use their social organization to create a sense of community and belonging among their followers, or as a way to comment on societal issues or political ideologies.

One common aspect of parody religions is that they often lack a centralized hierarchy or leadership structure. Instead, many parody religions operate as decentralized communities, with individual followers taking on roles and responsibilities as needed. For example, the Church of the Flying Spaghetti Monster has no official leaders, and instead relies on a community of individuals to organize events and spread the message of the religion.

Parody religions may also use their social organization to comment on societal issues or political ideologies. The Church of Euthanasia, for example, encourages its followers to live a sustainable lifestyle and reduce their environmental impact, and has organized protests and demonstrations to raise awareness for these issues.

== Usage by atheist commentators ==
I contend that we are both atheists. I just believe in one fewer god than you do. When you understand why you dismiss all the other possible gods, you will understand why I dismiss yours.

— Stephen F. Roberts

Many atheists, including Richard Dawkins, use parody religions such as those of the Flying Spaghetti Monster and the Invisible Pink Unicorn – as well as ancient gods like Zeus and Thor – as modern versions of Russell's teapot to argue that the burden of proof is on the believer, not the atheist.

Dawkins also created a parody of the criticism of atheism, coining the term athorism, or the firm belief that the Norse deity Thor does not exist. The intention is to emphasize that atheism is not a form of religious creed, but merely a denial of specific beliefs. A common challenge against atheism is the idea that atheism is itself a form of "faith", a belief without proof. The theist might say, "No one can prove that God does not exist, therefore an atheist is exercising faith by asserting that there is no God." Dawkins argues that by replacing the word "God" with "Thor" one should see that the assertion is fallacious. The burden of proof, he claims, rests upon the believer in the supernatural, not upon the non-believer who considers such things unlikely. Athorism is an attempt to illustrate through absurdity that there is no logical difference between disbelieving particular religions.

== Legal issues ==
Cavanaugh v. Bartelt et al.: Stephen Cavanaugh, an inmate at the Nebraska State Penitentiary, sued prison officials for refusing to accommodate his religious rights and requests, such as "the ability to order and wear religious clothing and pendants, the right to meet for weekly worship services and classes and the right to receive communion." Cavanaugh identifies as a Pastafarian and practices FSMism. Cavanaugh claimed that by prison officials rejecting his requests, his First Amendment Right was violated. Ultimately, the Court found that FSMism could not be defined as a religion under federal statutes and they granted the defendants' motion to dismiss.

Netherlands and The Church of the Flying Spaghetti Monster: In 2018, the Dutch court ruled that law student Mienke de Wilde did not qualify for religious exemption in wearing Pastafarian headwear for a government issued ID photo. The court claimed that "Pastafarianism lacked the seriousness and coherence of a legitimate religious faith."

== See also ==
- New religious movement
- Religious humanism
- Religious satire
- Russell's teapot
- Syncretism

== Notes and references ==
=== Works cited ===
- Greer, J. C. (2016). "'Discordians stick apart': The institutional turn within contemporary Discordianism". In Cusack, Carole M.; Kosnáč, Pavol (eds.). Invented Religions: Imagination, Fiction and Faith. Routledge. ISBN 978-1-317-11325-6.
- Robertson, David G. (2012). "Making the Donkey Visible: Discordianism in the Works of Robert Anton Wilson". In Cusack, Carole M.; Norman, Alex (eds.). Handbook of New Religions and Cultural Production. Brill. pp. 421–444. ISBN 978-90-04-22187-1.
- Robertson, David G. (2016). "SubGenius vs The Conspiracy: Playfulness and sincerity in invented religions". In Cusack, Carole M.; Kosnáč, Pavol (eds.). Fiction, Invention and Hyper-reality: From Popular Culture to Religion. Taylor & Francis. ISBN 978-1-317-13549-4.
