= The World (Internet service provider) =

Internet service provider

- President: Barry Shein
- Key people: Jim Frost, Joe "Spike" Ilacqua, James "Kibo" Parry
- Website: TheWorld.com
- Launched: November 1989

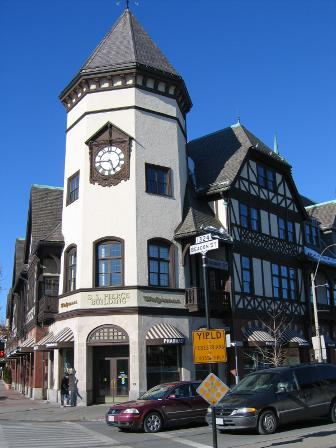
The S.S. Pierce Building, original Brookline headquarters of The World.

The World is an Internet service provider originally headquartered in Brookline, Massachusetts. It was the first commercial ISP in the world to provide a direct connection to the internet, with its first customer logging on in November 1989.

== Controversy ==
Many government and university installations blocked, threatened to block, or attempted to shut down The World's Internet connection until Software Tool & Die was eventually granted permission by the National Science Foundation to provide public Internet access on "an experimental basis."

== Domain name history ==
The World is operated by Software Tool & Die. The site and services were initially hosted solely under the domain name world.std.com which continues to function to this day.

Sometime in or before 1994, the domain name world.com had been purchased by Software Tool & Die and used as The World's primary domain name. In 2000, STD relinquished ownership of world.com and is no longer associated with it.

In 1999, STD obtained the domain name theworld.com, promoting the PascalCase version TheWorld.com as the primary domain name of The World.

== Services ==
The World still offers text-based dial-up and PPP dial-up, with over 9000 telephone access numbers throughout Canada, the United States, and Puerto Rico. Other features include shell access, with many historically standard shell features and utilities still offered. Additional user services include Usenet feed, personal web space, mailing lists, and email aliases. As of 2012, there were approximately 1750 active users.

More recent features include domain name hosting and complete website hosting.

== Community ==
The World offers a community Usenet hierarchy, wstd.*, which is accessible only to users of The World. There are over 60 newsgroups in this hierarchy. The World users may send each other Memos (password protected messaging) and access a list of all personal customer websites.

Much of The World's website and associated functionality was designed and built by James "Kibo" Parry.

== Notable sites at The World ==
- The Barry Shein Home Page
- Boston Japanimation Society
- Brookline Pax
- General Theory of Religion (archive)
- The Wombat Information Center
- The World's Index of Customers' Home Pages

== See also ==
- Netcom (United States)—West Coast dial-up ISP similar to The World
- The WELL
- The Source
