= Egosurfing =

Internet search for oneself

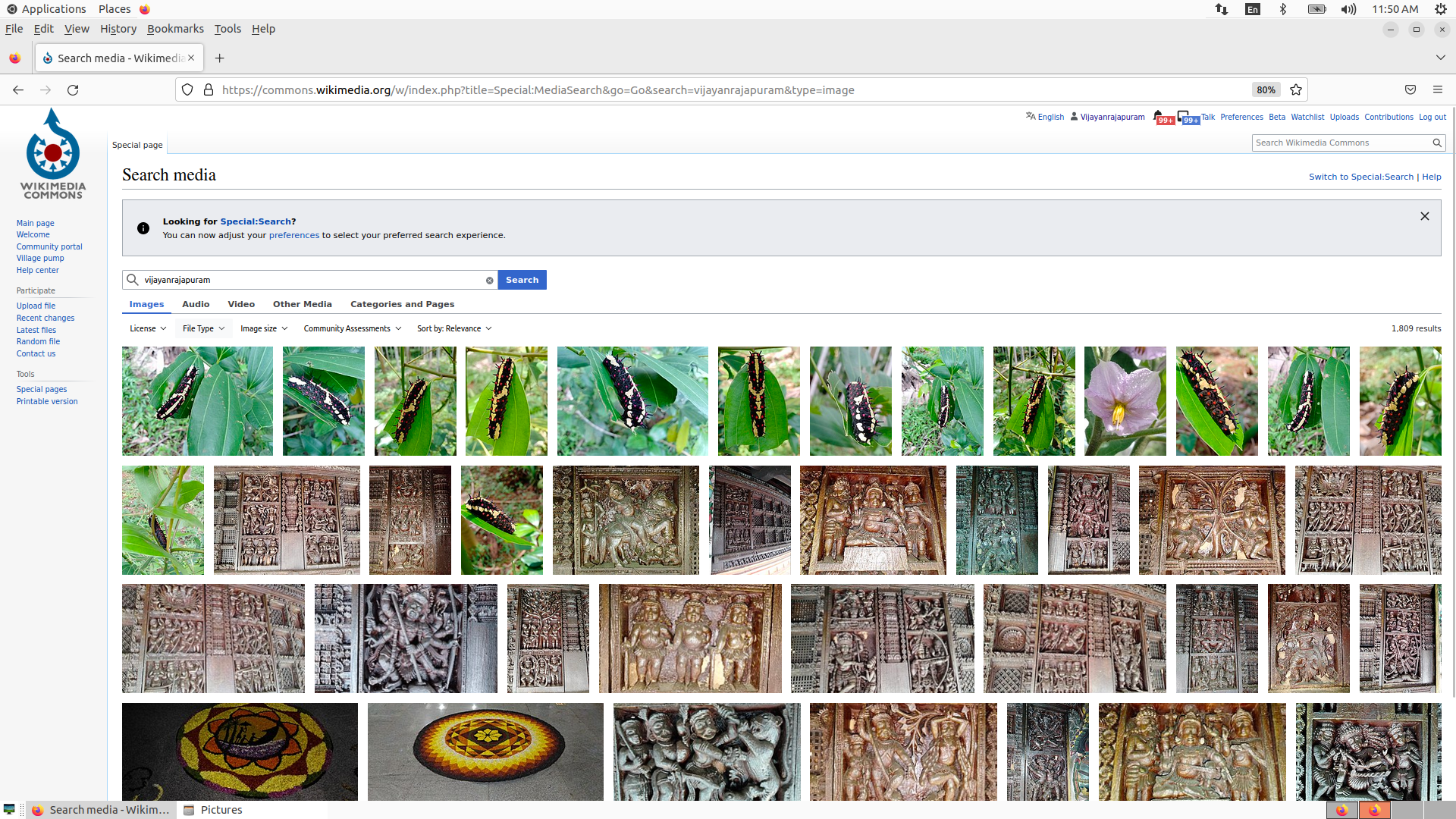
Image showing Egosurfing

Egosurfing (also vanity searching, egosearching, egogoogling, autogoogling, self-googling) is the practice of searching for one's own name, or pseudonym, on a popular search engine in order to review the results. Similarly, an egosurfer is one who surfs the Internet for their own name to see what information appears. It has become increasingly popular with the rise of Internet search engines, as well as free blogging and web-hosting services. Though Google is the search engine most commonly mentioned when referring to egosurfing, other widely known search engines include Yahoo, Bing, and DuckDuckGo.

The term was coined by Sean Carton in 1995 and first appeared in print as an entry in Gareth Branwyn's March 1995 Jargon Watch column in Wired. The practice of searching Usenet for one's own name was known as kibozing at the time, after James "Kibo" Parry, who was well known for replying in a surreal fashion to anyone who mentioned his name, on any newsgroup.

The term "Google twin" has been used to refer to a person who shares one's name, and whose information returns results on Google when one egosurfs.

Egosurfing is employed by many people for a variety of reasons. According to a study by the Pew Internet & American life project, 47% of American adult Internet users have undertaken a vanity search in Google or another search engine. Some egosurf purely for entertainment, such as finding celebrities with the same name. However, many people egosurf as a means of online reputation management. Egosurfing can be used to find data spills, released information that is undesirable to have in the public eye. By searching one's own name in an online search engine, one can take on the perspective of a stranger attempting to find out personal information. Some egosurf in order to conceal personal images or information from potential employers, clients, identity thieves and the like. Similarly, some use egosurfing to maintain a positive public image and to achieve self-promotion.

Many social networking sites, such as Facebook, allow users to make their profiles "searchable," meaning that their profile will appear in the appropriate search results. As a result, those seeking to maintain their privacy often egosurf in order to ensure that their profile does not appear in search engine results. As more people create online personas, many feel the need to more cautiously monitor their digital footprint, including information that they have not chosen to share online, such as telephone numbers and public records.

Although personal information available online can be difficult to remove, in 2009 Google introduced a feature allowing users to create a small box listing personal information such as name, occupation and location that appears on the first page of results when their name is searched. The box links to a full profile page, similar to one seen on Facebook. This Google profile can be linked to other social networking sites, such as one's blog, company website or Twitter feed. The more information that one includes on one's Google profile, the higher one's informational box will rank in the results, thus essentially encouraging one to post personal information online and continue egosurfing.
