= Christian Care Ministry =

Nonprofit organization

Christian Care Ministry, Inc.
- Founded: 1993
- Founder: John Reinhold
- Type: Non-Profit Christian Ministry
- Purpose: Christianity, Healthcare, Wellness (alternative medicine)
- Location: Melbourne, FL
- Origins: Acts 2:42-47
- Region served: United States, with specific disclosures for IL, KS, KY, ME, MD, MO, PA, TX, WI, MT
- Services: Medi-Share, Manna
- Method: Health Coaching, Mission (Christianity), Prayer
- Members: c. 300,000+
- Key people: Interim Chief Executive Officer & Chief Operating Officer: Joe Turner, Chief Financial Officer, Mark Joos, Chief People Officer, Tony Webster, Chief Technology Officer, Thomas Sanders
- Employees: 700+
- Website: http://www.mychristiancare.org

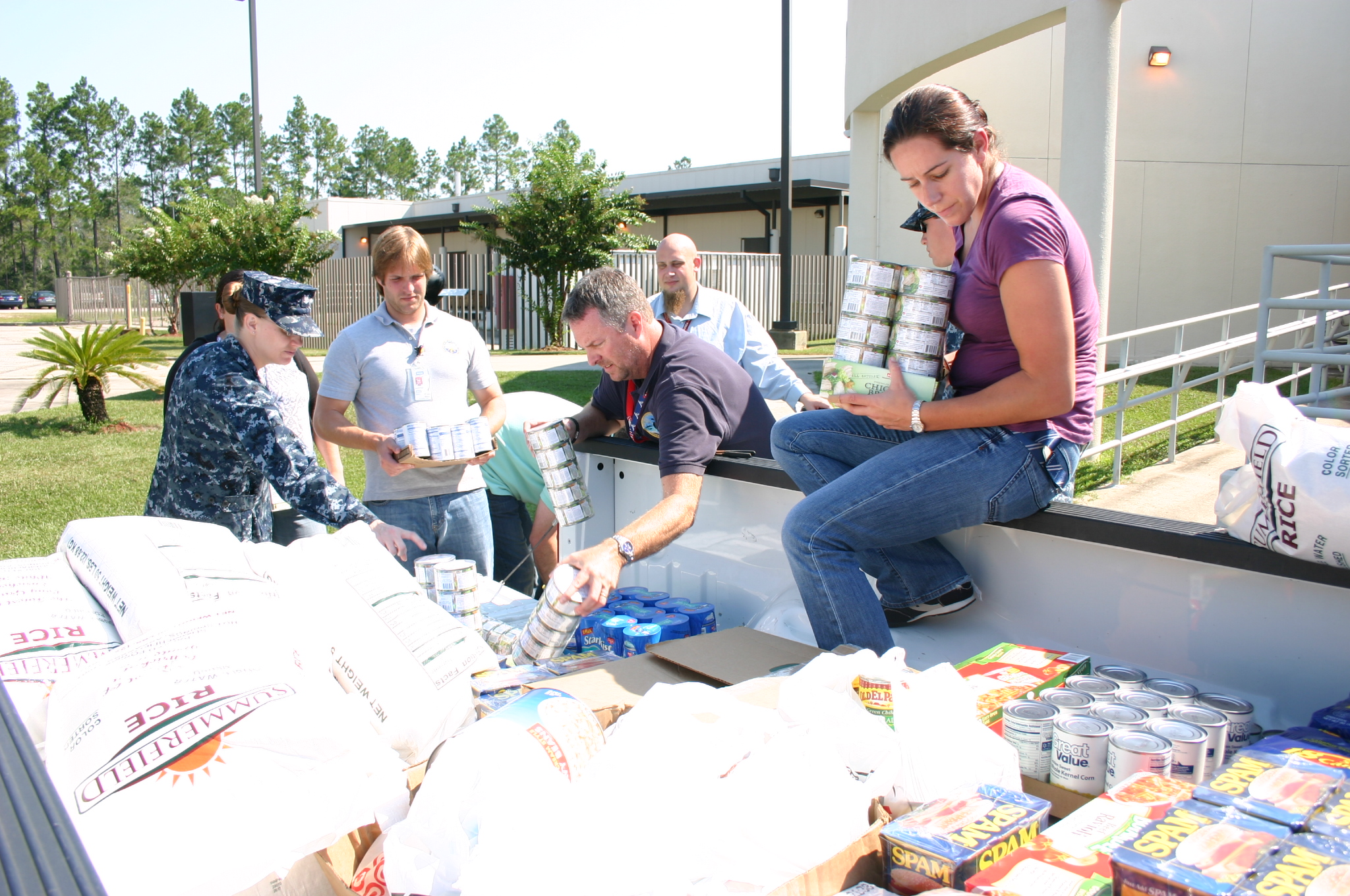

Christian Care Ministry is a nonprofit organization based in Melbourne, Florida. It was founded by Dr. E John Reinhold in 1993 as a division of the American Evangelistic Association (AEA), with the goal of providing what it calls "biblical healthcare solutions" for Christians. Medi-Share's affordable healthcare plan is exempt from the mandate to purchase health insurance under the Individual Mandate of the Affordable Care Act. With a program membership population of 317,576 (as of October 2017), Christian Care Ministry currently operates in all US states. Since 1993, members of the organization have shared and discounted medical expenses amounting to more than $2.1 billion. The common thread running through all of Christian Care Ministry's programs is the emphasis on a "healthy Biblical lifestyle." Christian Care Ministry is recognized by the American Heart Association as a Gold-Level Fit-Friendly Company. Along with Samaritan Ministries and Christian Healthcare Ministries, Christian Care Ministry represents one of the three largest Christian healthcare sharing ministries in the U.S.

== History ==
Christian Care Ministry was formed in 1993 when E. John Reinhold, a member of the AEA, decided to formalize the casual medical bill sharing process that existed among some of the association's members. Dr. Reinhold established guidelines for the sharing of members’ medical bills. That same year, he moved his family to Melbourne, Florida, where Christian Care Ministry is still based today.

== Healthcare bill-sharing program ==
In order to participate in Christian Care Ministry's bill sharing program, members must identify as Christians, ascribe to the company's Statement of Faith, and be active members of a church community.

=== Medi-Share ===
Medi-Share is the main focus of Christian Care Ministry and has been the primary service of Christian Care Ministry since 1993. It is a Christian healthcare system of medical bill sharing. However, Medi-Share is not insurance, and not all medical conditions are eligible for sharing. Participants pay an AHP (Annual Household Portion) toward their own medical costs; expenses beyond this are eligible for sharing among the ministry's membership. As of 2005, Medi-Share has grown to more than 60,000 members who share millions of dollars annually to pay one another's medical bills.

==== Eligibility ====
Medi-Share is not insurance and does not guarantee that the medical costs of its members will be shared. Claims for certain conditions will not be paid, such as those caused by the use of tobacco in any form, the use of illegal drugs, the abuse of legal medications or alcohol, "sexual relations outside of a Biblical Christian marriage", and "participation in activities that represent a willful disregard for personal safety". Additionally, claims for certain medical services will not be paid, such as birth control, infertility treatment, vasectomies, tubal ligation, and more than 100 days of skilled nursing facility care.

==== Legality ====
In 2002, Christian Care's Medi-Share bill-sharing program was challenged by some states’ insurance regulators due to its status as a Christian healthcare organization. 43 states have inquired about the legality of the program, and in some cases, legal action has been taken. A series of court cases in Kentucky resulted from the specific way in which Medi-Share processed members’ shares and disbursed payments. Changes have since been made to the Medi-Share system to bring it into line with state regulations and to maintain the organization's non-insurance status. As of June 25, 2013, the court ruled that Medi-Share was allowed to operate in Kentucky. Medi-Share operates legally in 50 states, with state disclosures specific to Illinois, Kansas, Kentucky, Maine, Maryland, Missouri, Pennsylvania, Texas, and Wisconsin.

==== Exemption from the Affordable Care Act Mandate ====
Medi-Share program membership numbers have seen an increase, which may be related to the Individual Mandate of the Affordable Care Act, which initially required that all individuals in the U.S. have health insurance by 2014 or face tax penalties. This mandate has been since repealed federally, although it still stands in some states that have their own state healthcare exchange. Medi-Share members, like those of other healthcare sharing organizations, are exempt from the Individual Mandate and are not required to purchase health insurance. When healthcare reform was up for debate in 2010, public interest in faith based bill-sharing programs like Medi-Share grew by 150 percent. Since the passage of the Affordable Care Act, Medi-Share membership rates have risen. Prior to passage of the ACA, annual membership grew at a rate of 10 percent per year. Since the bill's passage, Medi-Share membership has increased by 15 percent per year.
