= Balamangalam =

Malayalam comic magazine published between 1980 and 2012

- Cover of a Balamangalam issue
- Editor in charge: Manu Prathap
- Categories: Comic magazine
- Frequency: Fortnightly
- Publisher: Sabu Varghese
- Founded: 1980
- Final issue: 2012
- Company: Mangalam Publications
- Country: India
- Based in: Kottayam, Kerala
- Language: Malayalam

Balamangalam was a Malayalam comic magazine published from 1980 to 2012. It was also published in Kannada under the title Balamangala.

== History ==
Balamangalam was first published in 1980. The publisher was Mangalam Publications (India) Private Limited. The fortnightly magazine featured, along with the comic strips, children's stories, rhymes and puzzles. Its target audience was children. The headquarters of the magazine was in Kottayam.

In October 2012, Mangalam Publications, the owners of Balamangalam, announced that they would cease publication due to poor sales. Following an outcry on social media, the publishers stated that "the closure is just temporary and Balamangalam may return soon." However, the magazine remained closed.

== Kannada-language version ==
Balamangala in Kannada
- Categories: Comic magazine
- Frequency: Fortnightly
- Format: Print (paperback)
- Publisher: Mangalam Publications
- Company: Mangalam Publications
- Country: India
- Based in: Kottayam, Kerala
- Language: Kannada

Balamangala was the Kannada language edition of Balamangalam and was circulated in Karnataka, India. It was published by Mangalam Publication (India) Pvt. Ltd., located in Kottayam, Kerala.

Along with comic strips, the magazine featured children's stories, rhymes, puzzles and crosswords, including the fictional characters Dinga, Shaktimaddu, Kaadina Kitta, Keraga, Pingala, Karingaada, Tuttu, Chenchu, Tiko, Chomu, Thangu Maama, Onti Salaga, and Chippu Delu.

Harsha, a 15-year-old boy's first short story, "Mola Matthu Nari" (meaning: Rabbit and Fox) was published in the magazine.

== Dinkoism ==
Based on the magazine's fictional character, Dinkan, a parody religion and a social movement called Dinkoism emerged and evolved on social networks organized by independent welfare groups in Kerala, India.

== See also ==
- List of Kannada-language magazines
- List of Malayalam-language periodicals
- Media in Kerala
- Media in Karnataka
- Media of India
