= Dudeism =

Philosophy and lifestyle

Dudeist logo

Dudeism (/ˈduːdɪzəm/) is a religion, philosophy, or lifestyle inspired by "The Dude", the protagonist of the Coen Brothers' 1998 film The Big Lebowski.

Dudeism's stated primary objective is to promote a modern form of Chinese Taoism, outlined in Tao Te Ching by Laozi (6th century BCE), blended with concepts from the Ancient Greek philosopher Epicurus (341–270 BCE), and presented in a style as personified by the character of Jeffrey "The Dude" Lebowski, a fictional character portrayed by Jeff Bridges in the film The Big Lebowski. Dudeism has sometimes been regarded as a mock religion due to its use of comedic film references and occasional criticism of religion in its traditional sense; however, its founder and many adherents take the underlying philosophy somewhat (although not overly) seriously. March 6 is the annual sacred high holy day of Dudeism; entitled The Day of the Dude, the holiday is practiced on the same day the film was released in the US.

== Formation ==
Founded in 2005 by Oliver Benjamin, a journalist based in Chiang Mai, Thailand, Dudeism's official organizational name is The Church of the Latter-Day Dude. An estimated 800,000 Dudeist Priests have been ordained worldwide as of October 2026 and marriages have been officiated legally by Dudeist clergy in some US states.

Although Dudeism primarily makes use of iconography and narrative from The Big Lebowski, adherents believe that the Dudeist worldview has existed since the beginnings of civilization, primarily to correct societal tendencies towards aggression and excess. They list individuals such as Laozi, Epicurus, Heraclitus, Buddha, and the pre-ecclesiastical Jesus Christ as examples of "Great Dudes in History". More recent antecedents include pillars of American Transcendentalism such as Ralph Waldo Emerson and Walt Whitman, and humanists such as Kurt Vonnegut and Mark Twain.

== Philosophy ==
The Dudeist belief system is essentially a modernized form of Taoism stripped of all of its metaphysical and medical doctrines. Dudeism advocates and encourages the practice of "going with the flow", "being cool headed", and "taking it easy" in the face of life's difficulties, believing that this is the only way to live in harmony with our inner nature and the challenges of interacting with other people. It also aims to assuage feelings of inadequacy that arise in societies which place a heavy emphasis on achievement and personal fortune. Consequently, simple everyday pleasures like bathing, bowling, and hanging out with friends are seen as far preferable to the accumulation of wealth and the spending of money as a means to achieve happiness and spiritual fulfillment. As the Dude himself says in the film: "the dude abides", which essentially just means one should relax, enjoy the simple pleasures of life, be generally tolerant of others, maintain equanimity in the face of adversity, and encourage others to do the same.

== Publications ==
The Church of the Latter-Day Dude launched its official publication, The Dudespaper, in the fall of 2008. A Dudeist holy book, The Tao Dude Ching, went online in July 2009. It was renamed The Dude De Ching in December 2009 to avoid being confused with an upcoming book by Oliver Benjamin called The Tao of the Dude. The Dude De Ching is a reinterpretation of Peter Merel's translation of the Tao Te Ching using dialogue and story elements from The Big Lebowski. In 2016, The Dude De Ching was completely re-written by Benjamin, featuring a new Tao Te Ching translation and essays interpreting each verse.

In August 2011, The Abide Guide—a "Dudeist self-help book" employing life lessons from The Big Lebowski and other sources, was published by Ulysses Press. Written by Benjamin and the Arch Dudeship Dwayne Eutsey, it also contains material by other members of The Church of the Latter-Day Dude. An Italian translation was released in November 2013 under the title Il vangelo secondo Lebowski.

In November 2013, Lebowski 101 – a compilation of mostly scholarly essays edited by Benjamin which dissected and celebrated The Big Lebowski – was published by the Church. Over 80 writers and illustrators contributed to the book.

In April 2015, The Tao of the Dude was published, featuring essays and illustrations by Benjamin as well as quotes from various philosophers and writers throughout history. The objective of the book is to show that Dudeism is a philosophy that has existed since the dawn of civilization.

The Dude and the Zen Master, a 2013 book by Jeff Bridges and Buddhist teacher Bernie Glassman, uses the character as a starting point for philosophical discussion. Asked at a promotional event what The Dude would think of Dudeism, Bridges replied, "He'd be flabbergasted. And he would dig it."

On December 16, 2018, The Dudespaper announced an indefinite hiatus on its publication in favor of other means of disseminating the philosophy.
