= Health care sharing ministry =

Organizations in the United States in which health care costs are shared

Health care sharing ministries or health cost sharing ministries (HCSMs) are organizations in the United States in which health care costs are shared among members with common ethical or religious beliefs in a risk-pooling framework in some ways analogous to, but distinct from, health insurance.

Members of health care sharing ministries were exempt from the individual mandate requirement of the U.S. Patient Protection and Affordable Care Act that required individuals to have insurance from 2010 until 2019 when the federal tax penalty for violating the individual mandate was dropped under the terms of the Tax Cuts and Jobs Act of 2017.

Tennessee has a law stating that health care sharing ministries are not subject to state regulatory requirements for insurance companies.

== History ==
Predecessors to health care sharing ministries date back to at least the early 1900s. For many decades, "in Amish and Mennonite communities across the [US], people pooled their money to lighten the burden of debt for individuals during hard times." In the late 20th century, this broadened out to larger communities by larger cost-sharing ministries within the Christian community.

Most health care sharing ministries are oriented toward practicing Christians.

The State of Oklahoma contested Medi-Share in 2007 for marketing information that promoted the cost-sharing option as "insurance", but that issue was resolved when they changed their approach, and by 2010, Medi-Share was able to operate in Oklahoma once again. In 2002, Kentucky obtained a restraining order to stop the sale of Medi-Share memberships because the company was selling unauthorized insurance. The president of the group operating Medi-Share has said that Medi-Share is "not promising to pay anyone's bills. It's more of a step in faith. We trust in the Lord." A majority of states, however, have enacted safe harbor laws specifying that the ministries are not insurance and do not need to be regulated as such. In addition, the U.S. Department of Health and Human Services issues exemption letters to ministries that have met the criteria to operate independently of the Affordable Care Act.

In 2010, at the time the U.S. Patient Protection and Affordable Care Act was passed, there were estimated to be about 100,000 people belonging to some type of medical bill-sharing ministry. By 2014, it was estimated to be 160,000; and by 2018, that number in the US had grown to 1 million.

The future of health care sharing ministries after Obamacare's individual mandate repeal was unclear, but a work published by Harvard Law School suggested that many people may continue to use them, and they could even expand for people ineligible for healthcare subsidies (i.e. above the income threshold).

== Membership ==
A January 2015 op-ed in The New York Times stated that the four main healthcare ministries in the US have a total combined membership of about 340,000, that membership has grown significantly because of the healthcare ministries' exemption to the insurance mandate of the Affordable Care Act, and that monthly cost of membership in a health care sharing ministry is generally lower than the cost of insurance rates. The Seattle Times also reported that membership had grown significantly, in a 2015 article.

Only the state of Colorado requires healthcare ministries to report their enrollment. In 2023, the Colorado Department of Regulatory Agencies reported that over one million people in the U.S. are members.

Most health sharing ministries tend to have restrictions. They usually require members to be in good health and make a statement of belief, as well. For instance, Samaritan Ministries requires a statement of Christian faith including belief in the true God and divinity of Jesus; Liberty HealthShare and Freedom HealthShare are more inclusive, accepting members with a wide variety of religious and ethical beliefs.

== Requirements under the Affordable Care Act ==
In order for members to be exempt from the since-repealed tax penalties outlined in the Affordable Care Act, ministries must meet the following qualifications:

- Must be a 501(c)(3) organization
- Members must share common ethical or religious beliefs
- Must not discriminate membership based on state of residence or employment
- Members cannot lose membership due to development of a medical condition
- Must have (or a predecessor must have) existed and been in practice continually since December 31, 1999 (a grandfather clause)
- Must be subject to an annual audit by an independent CPA which must be publicly available upon request

The five ministries that meet these qualifications are Christian Healthcare Ministries, Liberty HealthShare, Medi-Share, Samaritan Ministries, and OneShare.

In 2017, a healthcare sharing organization tailored to Jews, United Refuah, was launched. The group claims to be recognized as a healthcare sharing organization by the Centers for Medicare & Medicaid Services (CMS).

== Tax deductibility ==
Monthly share payments are not deductible from US federal income tax as either a medical expense (because it is not a payment for insurance) or a charitable deduction (because it is a payment for goods and services). Member payments in excess of the required monthly minimum, however, may be deductible as a charitable contribution. In a proposed rule, dated June 8, 2020, the IRS has proposed to change the deductibility of share payments.

U.S. Representative Mike Kelly (R-PA) introduced H.R. 8776, the Health Care Sharing Ministry Tax Parity Act on June 25, 2024. This legislation would allow members of health care sharing ministries (HCSMs) to deduct payments made as part of their membership in their taxes by classifying regular HCSM expenses as eligible medical care expenses.

== Criticism ==
Unlike regulated insurance companies, health care sharing ministries do not guarantee payment for members' health care and are not required by law to pay their members' claims for legitimate medical expenses.

Health insurance brokers in Massachusetts are not allowed to market health care sharing ministry memberships to consumers, to avoid misleading consumers into thinking they are low-price guaranteed-issue insurance plans. HCSMs are not required to cover pre-existing conditions, which has led to disputes over denial of payment.

In 2020, the California Department of Insurance issued a cease and desist order to Aliera Healthcare, Inc., and Trinity Healthshares, Inc., founded by Timothy Moses and his wife Shelley Steele, for violating California law by misleading California consumers into purchasing their products. It is estimated that Aliera and the Moses family pocketed 84% of member monthly plan sharing, allowing for up to 16% to be invested into the healthcare sharing ministry fund and drawing much criticism, as Affordable Care Act health plans require at least 80% of premiums to be paid towards medical plans.

In 2021 comedian John Oliver set up a mock healthcare sharing ministry in Florida called Our Lady of Perpetual Health (following his earlier satire Our Lady of Perpetual Exemption), satirizing what HCSMs are allowed to do by law, essentially having no obligation to provide any care.

In 2024 James L. McGinnis and Craig Anthony Reynolds, co-founders of Medical Cost Sharing, both pleaded guilty to wire fraud conspiracy. Their health care sharing ministry had received over $8 million in member contributions, of which they paid $5 million to themselves while paying out just $248,000 in health care claims.

Also in 2024, WeShare Health was fined $300,000 USD and barred from offering insurance-like products in Washington state after leaving members with hundreds of thousands of dollars of uncovered medical expenses in the state.

== See also ==
- Benefit society
