= Net Authority =

Net Authority was a parody web site created in 2001 by Rudis Muiznieks that pretended to be a Christian Internet censorship site for recording and tracking other web sites containing offensive content. The site shut down shortly afterwards, when Muiznieks found that it had gotten completely out of hand. After receiving a legal threat, he closed it down on the recommendation of his employer.

He reopened it a few years later in a watered-down form. It finally ceased operations in February 2008, allegedly because "fundamentalist religion [was] doing such a fantastic job of parodying itself" that Net Authority "could only pale in comparison to the real thing".

Net Authority purported to encourage an "Internet Acceptable Use Policy" to prohibit sites containing pornographic, hateful or blasphemous material, and sites containing "bestiality, including interracial relationships". Users could easily submit websites themselves, which would then be added to the database.

Notable victims included the BBC Radio 4's The Now Show in 2007 and The Register in 2001, who "f[e]ll for it completely".
