= United Church of Bacon =

Parody church whose main goals are social progress and raising money for other charities

- Orientation: Atheist/Skeptic
- Scripture: 8 Bacon Commandments
- Bacon Prophet: John
- Region: Worldwide
- Headquarters: Las Vegas
- Origin: 2010; Las Vegas
- Members: 30,000+
- Tax status: LLC
- Other name: Baconism
- Official website: unitedchurchofbacon.org

The United Church of Bacon is an atheist/skeptic philosophical church whose main goals are social progress and raising money for other charities, founded in 2010, by John Whiteside and friends. The church offers all kinds of traditional religious services, including weddings, baptisms, and funerals. Its founder chose a strange name for the church, and its belief in bacon, as a social critique that all churches have strange beliefs, seen from the outside. The church opposes special privileges to religions because religious people are somehow superior to for having strange beliefs. The church promotes separation of church and state, science education and critical thinking, and an end to discrimination against atheists. The official symbol of the organization is two pieces of bacon praying with the sun in the background.

== Founding ==
The Church of Bacon was founded during a meeting at Penn Jillette's house in 2010, to fight discrimination against atheists. The official launch was at The Amaz!ng Meeting, in 2012. They believe in practical atheism and do not believe in the existence of gods. They chose a funny bacon name with an argument that bacon is demonstrably real whereas god is imperceptible by the eye. The Church's mission statement is "Hail Bacon, full of grease, the Lard is with thee.”

== Tenets ==
The chief criterion for joining is that members must love the smell of bacon, which can be turkey bacon or vegetarian bacon. Officiants are known as friars.

The main code are the 8 bacon commandments (previously 9):

1. Be Skeptical
2. Respect Boundaries
3. Normalize Atheists & Religion
4. Have Fun
5. Be Good
6. Be Generous
7. Praise Bacon
8. Advocate for fair church taxation

The 9th commandment was originally "Pay Taxes", but was later changed.

== Activism ==
The United Church of Bacon (UCB) is a philosophical parody church that fights against atheist discrimination, for separation of church and state, and for marriage equality. It has supported or organized several causes.

In 2015, UCB was denied notary services by Wells Fargo, which gained international attention. Wells Fargo denied discrimination. The founder of the church later recorded seven out of eleven Wells Fargo branches denying simple notarisations. Wells Fargo quietly changed their notary policy in 2016, and since then UCB has not had a problem with Wells Fargo.

The United Church of Bacon currently has over 3700 clergy. Application for clergy is free, and if approved UCB clergy cannot charge for their services. Instead, clergy are encouraged to ask whomever is provided services to donate to either the charity of their choice or from a list on their website. UCB has no affiliation with the charities recommended.

== Billboards ==
UCB has posted billboards in Las Vegas, Nevada in order to spread awareness of both itself and various atheist and skeptic messages. These billboards have created discussion on various social media platforms about the church and its message.

=== June 2015 ===
This billboard featured a quote by Thomas Paine to fight discrimination against atheists. The quote states, “Infidelity is saying you believe something when you don't.”

=== April 2015 ===
One of the first billboards was put up in April 2015. The billboard featured the UCB logo and featured the phrase "bacon is our god because bacon is real". The billboard was displayed in 4 different locations around Las Vegas, Nevada. The timing of this billboard coincided with the UCB protest of Wells Fargo over religious discrimination.

=== December 2015 ===
The United Church of Bacon posted a holiday billboard in December 2015 which stated "Merry Christmas and Happy Hanukkah from 13,000+ Atheists & Skeptics at United Church of Bacon".

=== February 2014 ===
The first billboard run by the United Church of Bacon was part of a rotating digital billboard along the 215 freeway in Las Vegas, NV. It displayed 2 quotes in 8 second rotating displays.

=== June 2022 ===
The United Church of Bacon posted 2 billboards saying "Bacon is our God" in Birmingham, AL.
