= Invisible Pink Unicorn =

Satirical goddess of a parody religion

A depiction of the Invisible Pink Unicorn, in the style of a heraldic animal springing

The Invisible Pink Unicorn (IPU) is the goddess of a parody religion used to satirize theistic beliefs, taking the form of a unicorn that is paradoxically both invisible and pink. The IPU is a rhetorical illustration used by agnostics, atheists, and other religious skeptics as a contemporary version of Russell's teapot, sometimes mentioned in conjunction with the Flying Spaghetti Monster.

The IPU is used to argue that supernatural beliefs are arbitrary by, for example, replacing the word God in any theistic statement with Invisible Pink Unicorn. The mutually exclusive attributes of pinkness and invisibility, coupled with the inability to disprove the IPU's existence, satirize properties that some theists attribute to a theistic deity.

== History ==
Russell's teapot is an analogy coined by the philosopher Bertrand Russell (1872–1970) to illustrate that the philosophic burden of proof lies upon a person making scientifically unfalsifiable claims rather than shifting the burden of proof to others, specifically in the case of religion. Russell wrote that, if he claims that a teapot orbits the Sun somewhere in space between the Earth and Mars, it is nonsensical for him to expect others to believe him on the ground that they cannot prove him wrong. Russell's teapot is still referred to in discussions concerning the existence of God.

The IPU seems to have become notable primarily through online culture: in addition to alt.atheism, where IPU frequently came up in discussions, there are now a number of web sites dedicated to her. An early documented reference to the IPU was on July 7, 1990, on the Usenet discussion group alt.atheism. Other sources concerning IPU state that she was "revealed to us" on alt.atheism.

The concept was further developed by a group of college students from 1994 to 1995 on the ISCA Telnet-based BBS. The students created a manifesto that detailed a nonsensical (yet internally consistent) religion based on a multitude of invisible pink unicorns. It is from this document that the most famous quotation concerning IPUs originated:

Invisible Pink Unicorns are beings of great spiritual power. We know this because they are capable of being invisible and pink at the same time. Like all religions, the Faith of the Invisible Pink Unicorns is based upon both logic and faith. We have faith that they are pink; we logically know that they are invisible because we can't see them.

— Serah Eley

== Concepts ==
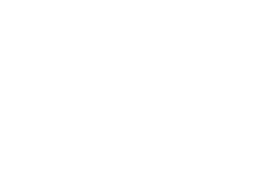
Blank images have been humorously presented as depictions of the Invisible Pink Unicorn in order to highlight her invisibility. (In this image, alpha compositing makes it transparent.)

It is common when discussing the Invisible Pink Unicorn to point out that because she is invisible, no one can prove that she does not exist (or indeed that she is not pink). This is a parody of similar theistic claims about God: that God, as creator of the universe, is not subject to its laws and thus not physically detecting him tells us nothing about his existence or lack thereof. The Invisible Pink Unicorn is an illustration that attempts to demonstrate the absurdity of citing attributes and a lack of evidence as proof of a deity's existence. Her two defining attributes, invisibility and color (pink), are inconsistent and contradictory; this is part of the satire. The paradox of something being invisible yet having visible characteristics (color) is reflected in some East Asian cultures, wherein an invisible red string is said to connect people who have a shared or linked destiny.

There are humorous mock debates among her "followers" concerning her other attributes, such as whether she is completely invisible or invisible to most, but visible only to those who have faith in her (bearing similarities to "The Emperor's New Clothes"). Some arguments are quite elaborate and tortuous, satirizing the disputatiousness and intricacy of the theological debates that occur in many religions.

The Invisible Pink Unicorn is also used to de-deify religious texts. The goal is to have the reader experience the text without heavily loaded concepts that many readers associate with omnipotence, or read with an unquestioned faith. It is argued that when someone re-reads the same text with all direct references to God replaced with the Invisible Pink Unicorn, the reader may see the text in a new and more critical way:

In the beginning the Invisible Pink Unicorn created the heavens and the earth...and the Spirit of the Invisible Pink Unicorn was hovering over the waters. And the Invisible Pink Unicorn said, "Let there be light," and there was light. The Invisible Pink Unicorn saw that the light was good, and she separated the light from the darkness.

— Genesis 1:1 (modified)

== Similar concepts ==
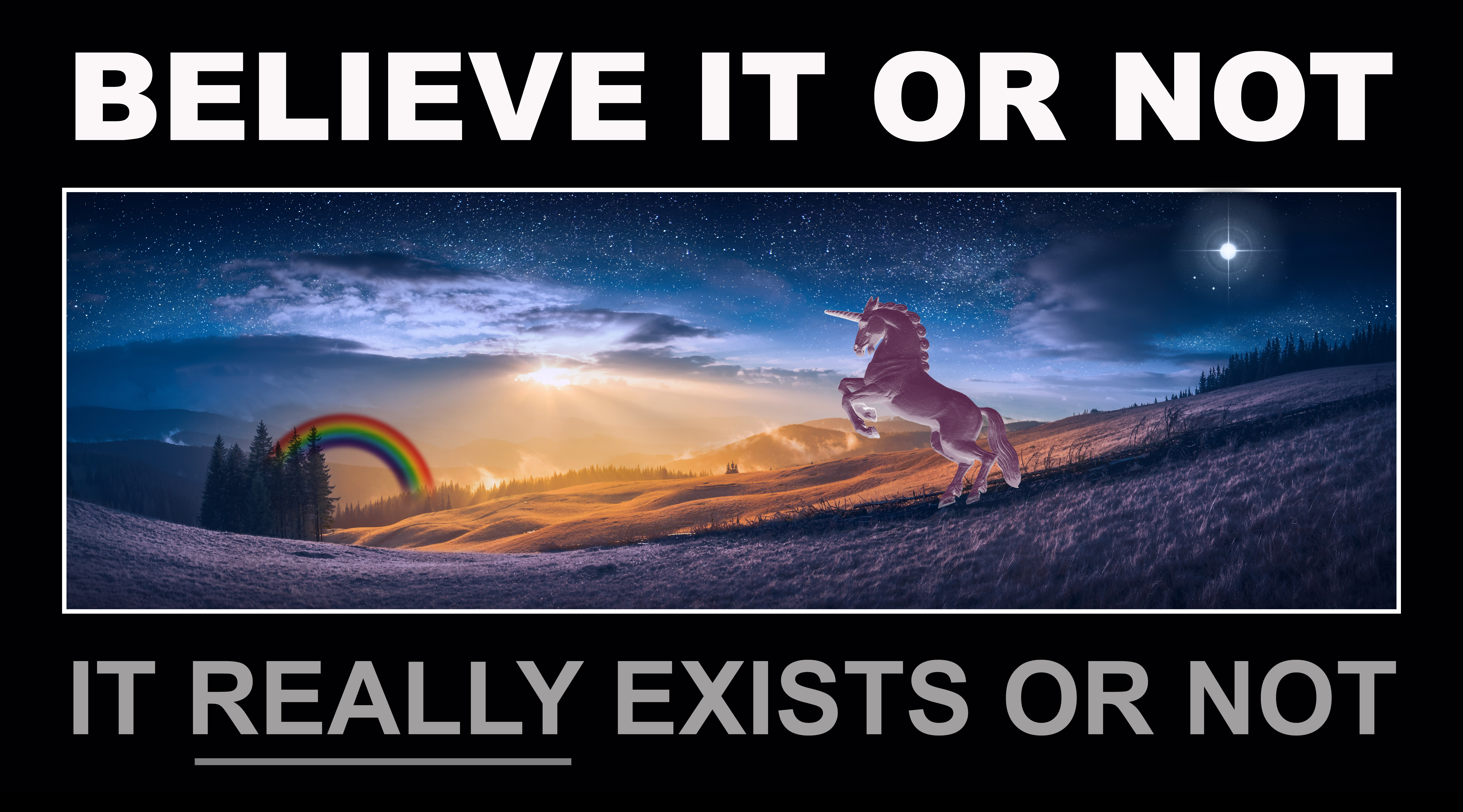
A parody motivational poster depicting the Invisible Pink Unicorn.

In 1996, a unicorn that no one can see was adapted as a teaching device at Camp Quest, the first free-thought summer camp for children established in the United States, by Edwin F Kagin and the Free Inquiry Group of Cincinnati. As reported years later in the July 21, 2006 Cincinnati Enquirer, "Campers must try to prove that imaginary unicorns—as a metaphor for God—don't exist." Richard Dawkins alluded to unicorns in this connection in his 2006 book The God Delusion, writing that "Russell's teapot, of course, stands for an infinite number of things whose existence is conceivable and cannot be disproved. [...] A philosophical favorite is the invisible, intangible, inaudible unicorn."
