= Dinkan =

Indian cartoon character

- Dinkan (comic) character
- First appearance: Balamangalam (1983)
- Created by: N. Somasekharan (concept) Baby (illustrations)
- Native name: ഡിങ്കൻ (Malayalam)

In-universe information
- Aliases: Dinka; Dinga
- Species: Mouse
- Gender: Male
- Occupation: Superhero
- Origin: Pankila Forest
- Nationality: Indian
- Abilities: Superior strength Enhanced Senses high endurance fight
- Supporting character of: Mittu
- Enemy: Nambolan

Dinkan (malayalam: ഡിങ്കൻ) is an Indian cartoon character created by N. Somasekharan and artist Baby in 1983. The series is about Dinkan, a fictional anthropomorphic superhero mouse who appears in an eponymous Malayalam comic story series in children's magazine Balamangalam. Some modern day rationalists of Kerala use Dinkan to mock organized religion and religious intolerance.

== History ==
Dinkan (ഡിങ്കൻ) was created by story-writer N. Somasekharan and artist Baby in 1983. Dinkan was one of the earliest superhero characters created in India and it quickly became popular among children. Like Terrytoons created Mighty Mouse and several other superhero characters, Dinkan borrowed a few traits from the iconic DC Comics character Superman. He also had characteristics of Iron Man.

== Character biography ==
Dinkan was born in Pankila forest, somewhere in Kerala, India. He was a naughty mouse, who wasn't disciplined. During one of his escapades, Dinkan was abducted by aliens from an unknown planet. They conducted experiments on him which ended up giving him superior strength, enhanced senses and the ability to fly. Somehow Dinkan found himself back in the Pankila forest and he decided to use his powers for the well-being of animals in the forest.

== Dinkoism ==
Dinkoism has emerged as a parody religion on social networks organized by some atheists in Kerala, India. This religion celebrates Dinkan as their God in an attempt to bring awareness of the fallacies and practices of traditional religions.

BBC covered the Dinkoist religion in its BBCTrending Programme. BBC reported Dinkoism as an atheist movement with significant growth in the social media.

== Growing recognition ==
On January 3, 2016, a group of dinkoists, calling themselves Mooshikasena (the Rat Army), went to protest in front of actor Dileep's Dhe Puttu Restaurant to protest his film titled Professor Dinkan on the grounds that it offended their religious sentiments. This was a mockery of similar protests around the world, especially in India.

Also in January 2016, a Dinkoist in California won the right to have a license plate for his car with Dinkan written on it, in recognition of his belief.
