= List of things named after Thomas Bayes =

Thomas Bayes (/beɪz/ BAYZ; c. 1701 – 1761) was an English statistician, philosopher, and Presbyterian minister.

Bayesian (/ˈbeɪziən/ BAY-zee-ən or /ˈbeɪʒən/ BAY-zhən) may be either any of a range of concepts and approaches that relate to statistical methods based on Bayes' theorem, or a follower of these methods.

== Bayes ==
- Bayes action – Mathematical decision rule
- Bayes Business School – Business school in London
- Bayes classifier – Classification algorithm in statistics
- Bayes discriminability index – Statistic used in signal detection theory
- Bayes error rate – Error rate in statistical mathematics
- Bayes estimator – Mathematical decision rule
- Bayes factor – Ratio of competing statistical models
- Bayes Impact – Non-profit organization
- Bayes linear statistics
- Bayes prior – Distribution of an uncertain quantity
- Bayes' theorem / Bayes–Price theorem – Mathematical rule for inverting probabilities, sometimes called Bayes' rule or Bayesian updating
- Empirical Bayes method – Bayesian statistical inference method
- Evidence under Bayes theorem
- Hierarchical Bayes model – Type of statistical model
- Laplace–Bayes estimator – Formula in probability theory
- Naive Bayes classifier – Probabilistic classification algorithm
- Random naive Bayes – Tree-based ensemble machine learning methods

== Bayesian ==
- Approximate Bayesian computation – Computational method in Bayesian statistics
- Bayesian Analysis (journal)
- Bayesian approaches to brain function – Explaining the brain's abilities through statistical principles
- Bayesian average – Type of average
- Bayesian bootstrap – Statistical method
- Bayesian control rule – Type of heuristic technique
- Bayesian cognitive science
- Bayesian econometrics – Branch of econometrics
- Bayesian efficiency – Analog of Pareto efficiency for situations with incomplete information
- Bayesian epistemology – Probabilistic theory of knowledge
- Bayesian estimation of templates in computational anatomy
- Bayesian expected loss – Mathematical relation assigning a probability event to a cost
- Bayesian experimental design – Experimental design framework
- Bayesian game – Game theory concept
- Bayesian hierarchical modeling – Statistical model written in multiple levels
- Bayesian History Matching
- Bayesian inference – Method of statistical inference
  - Bayesian inference in marketing – Application of statistical methods to marketing processes
  - Bayesian inference in motor learning – Statistical tool
  - Bayesian inference in phylogeny – Statistical method for molecular phylogenetics
  - Bayesian inference using Gibbs sampling – Statistical software for Bayesian inference
- Bayesian information criterion – Criterion for model selection (BIC)
  - Widely applicable Bayesian information criterion (WBIC)
- Bayesian interpretation of kernel regularization
- Bayesian Kepler periodogram – Indirect method for finding extrasolar planets and brown dwarfs
- Bayesian knowledge tracing – Method used in intelligent tutoring systems
- Bayesian learning mechanisms
- Bayesian linear regression – Method of statistical analysis
- Bayesian model averaging – Statistics and machine learning technique (BMA)
- Bayesian model combination – Statistics and machine learning technique (BMC)
- Bayesian model of computational anatomy
- Bayesian model reduction – Mathematical method for quicker estimation of probable outcomes
- Bayesian model selection – Ratio of competing statistical models
- Bayesian multivariate linear regression – Bayesian approach to multivariate linear regression
- Bayesian Nash equilibrium – Game theory concept
- Bayesian network – Probabilistic graphical representation of causal relationships
- Bayesian neural network – Computational model used in machine learning, based on connected, hierarchical functions
- Bayesian operational modal analysis (BAYOMA)
- Bayesian-optimal mechanism
- Bayesian-optimal pricing
- Bayesian optimization – Statistical optimization technique
- Bayesian poisoning – Technique used by e-mail spammers
- Bayesian probability – Interpretation of probability
- Bayesian procedures – Categorization of data using statistics
- Bayesian programming – Statistics concept
- Bayesian program synthesis – Program synthesis technique
- Bayesian quadrature – Method in statistics
- Bayesian regret
- Bayesian search theory – Method for finding lost objects
- Bayesian spam filtering – Probabilistic classification algorithm
- Bayesian statistics – Theory and paradigm of statistics
- Bayesian structural time series – Statistical technique used for feature selection
- Bayesian support-vector machine – Set of methods for supervised statistical learning
- Bayesian survival analysis – Statistical method
- Bayesian tool for methylation analysis
- Bayesian vector autoregression – Statistical estimation method
- Bayesian (yacht) – Sailing superyacht sunk in 2024
- Dynamic Bayesian network – Probabilistic graphical model
- International Society for Bayesian Analysis
- Perfect Bayesian equilibrium – Solution concept in game theory (PBE)
- Quantum Bayesianism – Interpretation of quantum mechanics
- Recursive Bayesian estimation – Process for estimating a probability density function
- Robust Bayesian analysis – Type of sensitivity analysis
- Variable-order Bayesian network
- Variational Bayesian methods – Mathematical methods used in Bayesian inference and machine learning

== See also ==
- Active inference – Hypothesis in neuroscience
- Admissible decision rule – Type of "good" decision rule in Bayesian statistics
- Aumann's agreement theorem – Theorem in game theory
- Banburismus – Cryptanalytic process developed by Alan Turing during World War II
- Conditional Probability – Probability of an event occurring, given that another event has already occurred
- Credibility theory – Branch of actuarial mathematics
- Dempster–Shafer theory – Mathematical framework to model epistemic uncertainty, a generalization of Bayes' theorem.
- History of statistics § History of Bayesian statistics
- Inverse probability – Old term for the probability distribution of an unobserved variable
- Nested sampling algorithm – Method for numerical integration
- Markov blanket – Subset of variables that contains all the useful information
- Signaling game – Game class in game theory
- List of eponymous laws – Adages and sayings named after a person
