= Free energy =

Free energy may refer to:

== Science ==
- Free energy perturbation, a method based on statistical mechanics used in computational chemistry
- Free energy principle, a variational formulation of self-organisation in biological systems, applied in particular to neuroscience
- Free-energy relationship, a relationship in physical organic chemistry
- Principle of minimum energy, a thermodynamic formulation based on the second law
- Thermodynamic free energy, the energy in a physical system that can be converted to do work, including:
  - Gibbs free energy
  - Landau free energy (also known as grand potential)
  - Helmholtz free energy
- Variational free energy, a construct from information theory that is used in variational Bayesian methods

== Pseudoscience ==
- Free energy device, a hypothetical perpetual motion device that is supposedly capable of drawing energy from a hidden free energy field, which is unknown in science
- Free energy suppression conspiracy theory, in which advanced energy technologies are suppressed by governments or special interest groups
- History of perpetual motion machines, history of devices supposedly capable of drawing unlimited energy

== Other uses ==
- In economics, energy from sources that do not require an input, for example, fuel, which has to be paid for. Usually a sub-set of renewable energy. Common examples include hydroelectric dams, solar panels, wind turbines, and geothermal power, as well as sources where the fuel is essentially free, such as waste-to-energy power stations.
- Free Energy (band), a 5-piece rock band on DFA Records
