= ELBO =

ELBO may mean:

- Hellenic Vehicle Industry, a Greek vehicle manufacturer
- Evidence lower bound, a lower bound on the log-likelihood in Bayesian statistical inference
