= Predictive coding =

Theory of brain function

In neuroscience, psychology and cognitive science, predictive coding (also known as predictive processing) is a theory of brain function which postulates that the brain is constantly generating and updating a "mental model" of the environment. According to the theory, such a mental model is used to predict input signals from the senses that are then compared with the actual input signals from those senses. Predictive coding is one member of a wider set of theories that follow the Bayesian brain hypothesis.

== Origins ==
Theoretical ancestors to predictive coding date back as early as 1860 with Helmholtz's concept of unconscious inference. Unconscious inference refers to the idea that the human brain fills in visual information to make sense of a scene. For example, if something is relatively smaller than another object in the visual field, the brain uses that information as a likely cue of depth, such that the perceiver ultimately (and involuntarily) experiences depth. The understanding of perception as the interaction between sensory stimuli (bottom-up) and conceptual knowledge (top-down) continued to be established by Jerome Bruner who, starting in the 1940s, studied the ways in which needs, motivations and expectations influence perception, research that came to be known as 'New Look' psychology. In 1981, McClelland and Rumelhart examined the interaction between processing features (lines and contours) which form letters, which in turn form words. While the features suggest the presence of a word, they found that when letters were situated in the context of a word, people were able to identify them faster than when they were situated in a non-word without semantic context. McClelland and Rumelhart's parallel processing model describes perception as the meeting of top-down (conceptual) and bottom-up (sensory) elements.

In the late 1990s, the idea of top-down and bottom-up processing was translated into a computational model of vision by Rao and Ballard. Their paper demonstrated that there could be a generative model of a scene (top-down processing), which would receive feedback via error signals (how much the visual input varied from the prediction), which would subsequently lead to updating the prediction. The computational model was able to replicate well-established receptive field effects, as well as less understood extra-classical receptive field effects such as end-stopping.

In 2004, Rick Grush proposed a model of neural perceptual processing, the emulation theory of representation, according to which the brain constantly generates predictions based on a generative model (what Grush called an ‘emulator’) and compares that prediction to the actual sensory input. The difference, or ‘sensory residual’, would then be used to update the model so as to produce a more accurate estimate of the perceived domain. On Grush’s account, the top-down and bottom-up signals would be combined in a way sensitive to the expected noise (aka uncertainty) in the bottom-up signal, so that in situations in which the sensory signal was known to be less trustworthy, the top-down prediction would be given greater weight, and vice versa. The emulation framework was also shown to be hierarchical, with modality-specific emulators providing top-down expectations for sensory signals as well as higher-level emulators providing expectations of the distal causes of those signals. Grush applied the theory to visual perception, visual and motor imagery, language, and theory of mind phenomena.

== General framework ==
Conceptual Schematic of Predictive Coding with 2 levels

Predictive coding was initially developed as a model of the sensory system, where the brain solves the problem of modelling distal causes of sensory input through a version of Bayesian inference. It assumes that the brain maintains active internal representations of the distal causes, which enable it to predict the sensory inputs. A comparison between predictions and sensory input yields a difference measure (e.g. prediction error, free energy, or surprise) which, if it is sufficiently large beyond the levels of expected statistical noise, will cause the internal model to update so that it better predicts sensory input in the future.

If, instead, the model accurately predicts driving sensory signals, activity at higher levels cancels out activity at lower levels, and the internal model remains unchanged. Thus, predictive coding inverts the conventional view of perception as a mostly bottom-up process, suggesting that it is largely constrained by prior predictions, where signals from the external world only shape perception to the extent that they are propagated up the cortical hierarchy in the form of prediction error.

Prediction errors can not only be used for inferring distal causes, but also for learning them via neural plasticity. Here the idea is that the representations learned by cortical neurons reflect the statistical regularities in the sensory data. This idea is also present in many other theories of neural learning, such as sparse coding, with the central difference being that in predictive coding not only the connections to sensory inputs are learned (i.e., the receptive field), but also top-down predictive connections from higher-level representations. This makes predictive coding similar to some other models of hierarchical learning, such as Helmholtz machines and Deep belief networks, which however employ different learning algorithms. Thus, the dual use of prediction errors for both inference and learning is one of the defining features of predictive coding.

=== Precision weighting ===
The precision of incoming sensory input is their predictability based on signal noise and other factors. Estimates of the precision are crucial for effectively minimizing prediction error, as it allows to weight sensory inputs and predictions according to their reliability. For instance, the noise in the visual signal varies between dawn and dusk, such that greater conditional confidence is assigned to sensory prediction errors in broad daylight than at nightfall. Similar approaches are successfully used in other algorithms performing Bayesian inference, e.g., for Bayesian filtering in the Kalman filter.

It has also been proposed that such weighting of prediction errors in proportion to their estimated precision is, in essence, attention, and that the process of devoting attention may be neurobiologically accomplished by ascending reticular activating systems (ARAS) optimizing the “gain” of prediction error units. However, it has also been argued that precision weighting can only explain “endogenous spatial attention”, but not other forms of attention.

=== Active inference ===
The same principle of prediction error minimization has been used to provide an account of behavior in which motor actions are not commands but descending proprioceptive predictions. In this scheme of active inference, classical reflex arcs are coordinated so as to selectively sample sensory input in ways that better fulfill predictions, thereby minimizing proprioceptive prediction errors. Indeed, Adams et al. (2013) review evidence suggesting that this view of hierarchical predictive coding in the motor system provides a principled and neurally plausible framework for explaining the agranular organization of the motor cortex. This view suggests that “perceptual and motor systems should not be regarded as separate but instead as a single active inference machine that tries to predict its sensory input in all domains: visual, auditory, somatosensory, interoceptive and, in the case of the motor system, proprioceptive.”

=== Dual process theory ===
The dual process theory of automatic and conscious cognitive processes lays the groundwork of understanding the operation of the human mind in psychology. Ideas related to dual process theories can be traced to William James’s work in 1890, which distinguished between habitual processes, based on automatic associations formed through experience, and voluntary processes, involving more effortful, conscious reasoning. It reflects a more hierarchical and conscious reasoning that represents a more willful process. These initial concepts of automatic and voluntary cognitive processes map onto modern dual process theory, conceptualized by many psychologists.

Some researchers have drawn parallels between dual process theories and predictive coding. In this view, automatic processing (often termed “system 1”) is compared to the initial processing of sensory information, whereas deliberate processing (“system 2”) is compared to the active maintenance of internal representations and the comparison between those representations and sensory input. Specifically, as noted by Jonathan Evans, system 2 of the dual process theory, which is characterized by a reflective process that allows an individual to override the intuitive process (i.e., initial perception of the input), closely aligns with the computation of the prediction error (i.e., discrepancy between expected value and the actual outcome). Although the process of active maintenance of internal representation, the constant monitoring of the conflict between new experiences and the internal representation, and the shifting of the posterior (i.e., updated belief after combining the prior belief and the actual evidence) is not uniquely differentiated in the dual-process model, the shared mechanism that requires a more deliberate and effortful cognitive process is captured by System 2.

=== Mental representation ===
Representation in the field of cognitive psychology and philosophy refers to the mental encoding of external stimuli. Specifically, it is defined as a hypothetical internal cognitive symbol that represents external reality or its abstractions (for more information about representation, see Mental Representation). In the field of philosophy, mental representation is treated as a mediator between the real world and the observer (for more information, see Philosophy of Mind). The field of cognitive psychology has attempted to test this concept by using neuroimaging methods, with the most common methods being functional magnetic resonance imaging (fMRI). This method involves looking at people’s brain activity related to external stimuli (such as showing them a picture).

In computational neuroscience, active predictive coding models typically include representations of visual stimuli as well as representations of goal-directed behavior. These representations interact to adapt to and learn new concepts. Some work has attempted to link findings in neuroscience and cognitive psychology by examining how prediction errors change over time. Changes in prediction error have been interpreted as evidence that internal representations are constantly adjusted in response to new sensory input, so that they better match events in the external world.

== Neural theory in predictive coding ==
Much of the early work that applied a predictive coding framework to neural mechanisms came from sensory processing, particularly in the visual cortex. These theories assume that the cortical architecture can be divided into hierarchically stacked levels, which correspond to different cortical regions. Every level is thought to house (at least) two types of neurons: “prediction neurons”, which aim to predict the bottom-up inputs to the current level, and "error neurons", which signal the difference between input and prediction. These neurons are thought to be mainly non-superficial and superficial pyramidal neurons, while interneurons take up different functions.

Within cortical regions, there is evidence that different cortical layers may facilitate the integration of feedforward and feed-backward projections across hierarchies. These cortical layers have therefore been assumed to be central in the computation of predictions and prediction errors, with the basic unit being a cortical column. A common view is that

- error neurons reside in supragranular layers 2 and 3, since these neurons show sparse activity and tend to respond to unexpected events,
- prediction neurons reside in deep layer 5, where many neurons exhibit dense responses,
- precision weighting might be implemented through diverse mechanism, such as neuromodulators or long range projections from other brain areas (e.g., thalamus).

However, thus far there is no consensus on how the brain most likely implements predictive coding. Some theories, for example, propose that supragranular layers contain, not only error, but also prediction neurons. It is also still debated through which mechanisms error neurons might compute the prediction error. Since prediction errors can be both negative and positive, but biological neurons can only show positive activity, more complex error coding schemes are required. To circumvent this problem, more recent theories have proposed that error computation might take place in neural dendrites instead. The neural architecture and computations proposed in these dendritic theories are similar to what has been proposed in Hierarchical temporal memory theory of cortex.

== Applying predictive coding ==
=== EEG/ERP ===
Electroencephalography (EEG) and event-related potential (ERP) research have been widely used to investigate predictive coding in humans. Within this framework, ERP components are often interpreted as neural markers of prediction-error signaling, generated when sensory input differs from what is expected. For example, the mismatch negativity (MMN), elicited by unexpected sounds, reflects automatic detection of prediction violations and adapts with learning and attention. Components related to performance monitoring, such as the error-related negativity (ERN/Ne) and error positivity, have been associated with the discrepancy between the internal representation of the correct response versus actual response. Later components such as the P300 and feedback-related negativity (FRN) have been linked to higher-order updating of cognitive or reward models. These findings have been interpreted as consistent with predictive coding models in which processing is organized hierarchically, from early perceptual mismatches to more abstract belief revisions.

Despite these insights, linking ERP components uniquely to prediction errors remains challenging. ERPs represent aggregate neural activity from overlapping sources, and their amplitudes are influenced by multiple cognitive processes such as attention, novelty, and salience of the stimuli, practice effects, and habituation to the stimuli. For instance, P300 amplitude often reflects general updating or arousal. EEG and ERP paradigms have provided important evidence for predictive processing, although alternative explanations remain. Nonetheless, careful experimental design and model-based analyses are required to distinguish between genuine prediction-error signals from broader cognitive or perceptual influences.

=== Perception ===
The empirical evidence for predictive coding is most robust for perceptual processing. As early as 1999, Rao and Ballard proposed a hierarchical visual processing model in which higher-order visual cortical area sends down predictions and the feedforward connections carry the residual errors between the predictions and the actual lower-level activities. According to this model, each level in the hierarchical model network (except the lowest level, which represents the image) attempts to predict the responses at the next lower level via feedback connections, and the error signal is used to correct the estimate of the input signal at each level concurrently. Emberson et al. established the top-down modulation in infants using a cross-modal audiovisual omission paradigm, determining that even infant brains have expectation about future sensory input that is carried downstream from visual cortices and are capable of expectation-based feedback. Functional near-infrared spectroscopy (fNIRS) data showed that infant occipital cortex responded to unexpected visual omission (with no visual information input) but not to expected visual omission. These results establish that in a hierarchically organized perception system, higher-order neurons send down predictions to lower-order neurons, which in turn sends back up the prediction error signal.

=== Interoception ===
There have been several competing models for the role of predictive coding in interoception.

In 2013, Anil Seth proposed that our subjective feeling states, otherwise known as emotions, are generated by predictive models that are actively built out of causal interoceptive appraisals. In relation to how we attribute internal states of others to causes, Sasha Ondobaka, James Kilner, and Karl Friston (2015) proposed that the free energy principle requires the brain to produce a continuous series of predictions with the goal of reducing the amount of prediction error that manifests as “free energy”. These errors are then used to model anticipatory information about what the state of the outside world will be and attributions of causes of that world state, including understanding of causes of others’ behavior. This is especially necessary because, to create these attributions, our multimodal sensory systems need interoceptive predictions to organize themselves. Therefore, Ondobaka posits that predictive coding is key to understanding other people's internal states.

In 2015, Lisa Feldman Barrett and W. Kyle Simmons proposed the Embodied Predictive Interoception Coding model, a framework that unifies Bayesian active inference principles with a physiological framework of corticocortical connections. Using this model, they posited that agranular visceromotor cortices are responsible for generating predictions about interoception, thus, defining the experience of interoception.

Contrary to the inductive notion that emotion categories are biologically distinct, Barrett proposed later the theory of constructed emotion, which is the account that a biological emotion category is constructed based on a conceptual category—the accumulation of instances sharing a goal. In a predictive coding model, Barrett hypothesizes that, in interoception, our brains regulate our bodies by activating "embodied simulations" (full-bodied representations of sensory experience) to anticipate what our brains predict that the external world will throw at us sensorially and how we will respond to it with action. These simulations are either preserved if, based on our brain's predictions, they prepare us well for what actually subsequently occurs in the external world, or they, and our predictions, are adjusted to compensate for their error in comparison to what actually occurs in the external world and how well-prepared we were for it. Then, in a trial-error-adjust process, our bodies find similarities in goals among certain successful anticipatory simulations and group them together under conceptual categories. Every time a new experience arises, our brains use this past trial-error-adjust history to match the new experience to one of the categories of accumulated corrected simulations that it shares the most similarity with. Then, they apply the corrected simulation of that category to the new experience in the hopes of preparing our bodies for the rest of the experience. If it does not, the prediction, the simulation, and perhaps the boundaries of the conceptual category are revised in the hopes of higher accuracy next time, and the process continues. Barrett hypothesizes that, when prediction error for a certain category of simulations for x-like experiences is minimized, what results is a correction-informed simulation that the body will reenact for every x-like experience, resulting in a correction-informed full-bodied representation of sensory experience—an emotion. In this sense, Barrett proposes that we construct our emotions because the conceptual category framework our brains use to compare new experiences, and to pick the appropriate predictive sensory simulation to activate, is built on the go.

=== Human development ===
From a developmental perspective, predictive coding has been examined in relation to the biological maturation of the brain systems involved in sensation and cognition, highlighting how the brain’s capacity to generate and update predictions evolves across early life. Evidence from neonatal studies demonstrates that prediction error mechanisms emerge very early in life: event-related potential recordings (patterns of brain activity observed in relation to specific events) show that even newborns differentiate between expected and unexpected sounds, suggesting the presence of a very basic form of sensory prediction. As children grow, these predictive capacities become more sophisticated as their brains mature and they gain experience (see more detailed information in Development of the nervous system). Research across later human developmental stages indicates that the development of abilities to direct and control attention and the inferential reasoning process occur together, as repeated interactions with the environment strengthen the brain’s internal models of sensory regularities (for more information on the sophistication and specialization of neural connections across developmental stages, see Synaptic pruning). This developmental trajectory has been described as a shift from mainly reactive sensory processing in infancy toward proactive, model-based perception in childhood. As networks of connected brain regions mature, they support top-down modulation, in which prior knowledge shapes how sensory information is processed, and precision weighting, which refers to how strongly prior expectations versus new sensory input are taken into account (see Precision Weighting section of this Wikipedia page). Altogether, this line of work has been interpreted as suggesting that predictive coding may contribute to the development of efficient perception, attention, and learning across childhood, providing a computational framework for understanding how experience shapes the developing brain.

Studies of predictive coding in a developmental context often involve using repetition suppression (a reduction in a specific pattern of brain activity observed when someone is exposed to the same stimuli repeatedly), as it is commonly treated as a measure of reduced prediction error. In other words, diminished prediction error would indicate that the participant has been updating their mental representation (i.e., expectation) to be closer to the presented stimuli. Therefore, examination of the development of repetition suppression has been treated as a proxy for the development of predictive inference and mental representation. The application of predictive coding in human development is not without its limitations. For instance, most research studies testing predictive coding through neural measures (e.g., event-related brain potentials) require responses from the participant, which is not possible for infants. Furthermore, developmental changes in the anatomy and network of the brain make the interpretations of prediction error more complex, which warrants caution in the interpretations of the current literature.

==== Neurodevelopmental disorders ====
Differences in predictive coding processes have been proposed to play a role in neurodevelopmental disorders, such as autism spectrum disorders and Attention-Deficit Hyperactivity Disorder (ADHD). Given the role of predictive coding in guiding the perception of the environment as well as further interaction with the environment, some authors have suggested that differences in attention and cognitive processes related to predictive coding could serve as potential biomarkers, or biological correlates, for understanding neurodevelopmental disorders.

Under typical development, the predictive coding framework suggests that perception and interpretation of the perceived information rely on higher-order cognitive processes that minimize prediction error by continuously adjusting expectations to match incoming sensory input. According to predictive coding accounts, individuals with neurodevelopmental disorders, such as autism spectrum disorder (ASD) and ADHD, may show imbalances in how much weight is given to prior expectations versus incoming sensory evidence—a phenomenon sometimes referred to as precision weighting dysfunction. For example, in autism, research studies suggest that prior beliefs may be underweighted, leading to an overreliance on moment-to-moment sensory input and difficulties filtering out irrelevant stimuli, which manifests as sensory hypersensitivity and reduced ability to account for context when processing the stimulus. Across disorders, such differences have been proposed to lead to less accurate internal representations, which may impair the brain’s ability to form accurate predictions about social cues, rewards, and environments. As a result, predictive coding abnormalities have been proposed as a possible cognitive model that could help link diverse symptom profiles in neurodevelopmental conditions to underlying differences in hierarchical information processing and learning.

=== Psychopathology ===
Altered predictive coding in psychological disorders has received wide attention, likely in an attempt to explain how symptoms of psychological disorders occur. Below are the descriptions of the current research looking at how problems with predictive coding may contribute to different psychological disorders.

Psychotic Disorders. Psychotic disorders are characterized by symptoms of hallucination (seeing, hearing, feeling, smelling, or tasting something that is not actually there) and delusion (a strongly held false belief that persists despite clear conflicting evidence). In applications of predictive coding, a mismatch between priors and prediction errors may explain these psychotic symptoms. There are three ways in which impaired predictive coding might contribute to these symptoms: 1) overweighing of sensory prediction errors, 2) weakened top-down priors, and 3) disrupted hierarchical communication between frontal and sensory regions. However, research disentangling different contributors to prediction error is limited.

Unlike typical conditions, where perception depends on balancing prior expectations (top-down predictions) with sensory evidence (bottom-up input), weighted by their precision, or estimated reliability, some studies show evidence that precision weighting may be dysregulated in people with psychosis, which leads to either underweighted priors or overweighted sensory prediction errors. Under this account, internal noise may be misinterpreted as meaningful sensory data, which could contribute to hallucinations, and spurious associations may contribute to delusional beliefs that are resistant to updating. Neurophysiological evidence supports this imbalance: individuals with schizophrenia show reduced mismatch negativity (MMN) and impaired prediction-error signaling in frontotemporal circuits of the brain, indicating failures to suppress or appropriately update sensory predictions.

At higher cognitive levels, some researchers link predictive coding accounts to the concept of aberrant salience, which refers to the attribution of undue importance to stimuli that would typically be considered irrelevant. This mechanism aligns with dopaminergic dysfunction, as dopamine is hypothesized to encode the precision of prediction errors; hyperdopaminergic states amplify noisy error signals, fueling delusional inferences and unstable perception. Together, these findings have been interpreted as consistent with the idea that psychosis may involve a breakdown in hierarchical predictive coding, in which disturbances in both low-level sensory prediction and high-level belief formation interact to produce characteristic symptoms.

Eating Disorders. The predictive coding framework has been applied to the study of eating disorders. In this approach, some theorists propose that disordered eating behaviors may partly arise from differences in interoception, the perception of internal bodily signals. Studies of interoception in the eating disorder field have focused on gastrointestinal interoception, which is defined as the process by which the nervous system detects and integrates signals originating from the gastrointestinal system. Specifically, recent studies started focusing on the relationships between different facets of gastrointestinal interoception profiles and various disordered eating behaviors (e.g., binge eating, restrictive eating), warranting the utility of a predictive coding framework in furthering the understanding of the mechanisms that drive disordered eating behaviors.

=== Computer science ===
With the rising popularity of representation learning, the theory has also been actively pursued and applied in machine learning and related fields.

Recent work has further explored connections between predictive coding principles and generative models, including world-model approaches in artificial intelligence. These approaches involve related computational concepts, such as prediction-based processing and internal model formation, which have been studied in both neuroscience and artificial intelligence research.

=== Challenges ===
One of the biggest challenges to test predictive coding has been the imprecision of exactly how prediction error minimization works. In some studies, the increase in BOLD signal has been interpreted as error signal while in others it indicates changes in the input representation. A crucial question that needs to be addressed is what exactly constitutes error signal and how it is computed at each level of information processing. Another challenge that has been posed is predictive coding's computational tractability. According to Kwisthout and van Rooij, the subcomputation in each level of the predictive coding framework potentially hides a computationally intractable problem, which amounts to “intractable hurdles” that computational modelers have yet to overcome.

Future research could focus on clarifying the neurophysiological mechanism and computational model of predictive coding.

=== Criticism ===
Neuroscientist Romain Brette states that the terminology used in predictive coding is misleading as it wrongly implies that predictive coding is a theory of anticipation, rather than a theory of efficient coding. Brette also states that many predictions can be made in a situation which renders the framework void of explanatory content.

The Dark-Room Problem is a critique which questions why organisms do not simply stay in a dark room to minimize surprise. Mark Bickhard states that attributing a prior of seeking light as an explanation is post-hoc. Brette states that learning does not solve the problem as organisms will move to the most predictable environment regardless of priors.

== See also ==
- Error-driven learning
- Blue Brain Project
- Cognitive biology
- Cognitive linguistics
- Cognitive neuropsychology
- Cognitive neuroscience
- Cognitive science
- Conceptual blending
- Conceptual metaphor
- Cortical column
- Embodied bilingual language
- Embodied cognitive science
- Embodied Embedded Cognition
- Embodied music cognition
- Enactivism
- Extended cognition
- Extended mind thesis
- Externalism
- Heuristic
- Image schema
- Moravec's paradox
- Neuroconstructivism
- Neuropsychology
- Neurophenomenology
- Philosophy of mind
- Plant cognition
- Practopoiesis
- Situated cognition
- Where Mathematics Comes From
