= Psychophysiological interaction =

Psychophysiological interaction (PPI) is a brain connectivity analysis method for functional brain imaging data, mainly functional magnetic resonance imaging (fMRI). It estimates context-dependent changes in effective connectivity (coupling) between brain regions. Thus, PPI analysis identifies brain regions whose activity depends on an interaction between psychological context (the task) and physiological state (the time course of brain activity) of the seed region.

== History and development ==
The PPI method was proposed by Friston and colleagues in 1997. The model includes an interaction term between a psychological variable (task design) and physiological variable (the time series of a brain region). If the interaction term can explain the brain activation of another brain region after taking into account the main effects of the psychological and physiological variables, then it implies a task-dependent connectivity between the two brain regions.

The PPI method is mainly applied to blood-oxygen-level dependent (BOLD) signals measured by functional MRI (fMRI). The hemodynamic response is slow compared with fast neuronal activities. Therefore, Gitelman and colleagues proposed to first deconvolve the BOLD time series of the seed with hemodynamic response function, so that the resulting "neuronal level" signals could match with the timing of the task design (the psychological variable). Before the multiplication, both the psychological and physiological variables should be centered.

If an fMRI experiment is designed with multiple conditions, then there will be multiple psychological variables included in the model. In this case, a modeling strategy named generalized PPI was proposed.

Traditionally, the PPI analysis was implemented using a seed-based strategy. That is, the PPI term is defined using a pre-defined seed, and a voxel-wise analysis is performed to identify regions in the whole brain that showed task modulated connectivity with the seed region. The PPI method can also be applied to every pair of regions in the brain, so that the whole-brain task modulated connectivity, i.e. task connectome, can be mapped.

== Implementations ==
Major fMRI data analysis software, including SPM, FSL, AFNI, and CONN, all have modules for PPI analysis. There is also Generalized PPI Toolbox, which is a MATLAB based toolbox dedicated for PPI analysis.

== See also ==
- Brain connectivity estimators
- Dynamic causal modeling
