= REBUS =

Theory about psychedelics

REBUS, an acronym of Relaxed Beliefs Under pSychedelics, is a model of affect concerning serotonergic psychedelics, associated with the theories of Karl Friston and Robin Carhart-Harris.
