= Max Welling =

Dutch computer scientist (born 1968)

- Born: 22 October 1968
- Education: Utrecht University
- Known for: Machine learning
- Awards: ECCV Koenderink Prize (2010)
- Scientific career
- Fields: Machine learning, Quantum mechanics
- Workplaces: University of Amsterdam
- Doctoral advisor: Gerard 't Hooft
- Website: amlab.science.uva.nl/people/MaxWelling/

Max Welling (born 1968) is a Dutch computer scientist in machine learning at the University of Amsterdam. Welling received his PhD in physics with a thesis on quantum gravity under the supervision of Gerard 't Hooft (1998) at Utrecht University. He has published on machine learning, computer vision, statistics and physics, and worked on variational autoencoders (VAEs) together with Durk Kingma.

In 2010 he shared with two authors a Koenderink Prize.

He also received 10-year Test of Time awards at the International Conference on Machine Learning (ICML) in 2021 and the International Conference on Learning Representations (ICLR) in 2024.

In 2025, Welling was elected a member of the Royal Netherlands Academy of Arts and Sciences.

== Career and research ==
In 2013, Welling co-founded Scyfer BV, a spin-off of the University of Amsterdam. In August 2017, Scyfer was acquired by Qualcomm. Welling has since then served as a Vice President of Technology at Qualcomm Netherlands. While at Qualcomm, Welling helped develop gauge-equivariant convolutional neural networks, a theoretical framework for creating neural networks that can learn patterns on spherical and curved objects rather than only on 2D arrays of pixels.

Welling was a Distinguished Scientist at Microsoft Research AI4Science, based in Amsterdam. As part of his work at Microsoft, Welling helped develop Aurora, an AI model that forecasts weather events using less computational power than comparable models.

In 2024, Welling co-founded CuspAI, a startup company that builds AI models to identify chemicals and materials that help address climate change and improve sustainability for processes such as semiconductor manufacturing. In July 2026, CuspAI raised $450 million in a Series B funding round, valuing the company at $2.6 billion.

Welling serves as CTO of CuspAI.

== Academic career ==
At the University of Amsterdam, Welling serves as a research chair in Machine Learning and is a principal member of the Amsterdam Machine Learning Lab (AMLab).

== Notable publications ==
- Kipf, Thomas N.; Welling, Max (2016-09-09). Semi-Supervised Classification with Graph Convolutional Networks. International Conference on Learning Representations (ICLR). doi:10.48550/ARXIV.1609.02907.
- Kingma, Diederik P; Welling, Max (2013-12-20). Auto-Encoding Variational Bayes. International Conference on Learning Representations (ICLR). doi:10.48550/ARXIV.1312.6114.
- Schlichtkrull, Michael; Kipf, Thomas N.; Bloem, Peter; van den Berg, Rianne; Titov, Ivan; Welling, Max (2018). "Modeling Relational Data with Graph Convolutional Networks". The Semantic Web. Vol. 10843. Cham: Springer International Publishing. doi:10.1007/978-3-319-93417-4_38. ISBN 978-3-319-93416-7.
- Kingma, Diederik P.; Welling, Max (2019-11-28). "An Introduction to Variational Autoencoders". Foundations and Trends in Machine Learning. 12 (4): 307–392. doi:10.1561/2200000056. ISSN 1935-8237.
- Kipf, Thomas N.; Welling, Max (2016-11-21). Variational Graph Auto-Encoders. NeurIPS Workshop on Bayesian Deep Learning (NeurIPS BDL). doi:10.48550/ARXIV.1611.07308.
