= Bayesian inference using Gibbs sampling =

Statistical software for Bayesian inference

Bayesian inference using Gibbs sampling (BUGS) is a statistical software for performing Bayesian inference using Markov chain Monte Carlo (MCMC) methods. It was developed by David Spiegelhalter at the Medical Research Council Biostatistics Unit in Cambridge in 1989 and released as free software in 1991.

The BUGS project has evolved through four main versions: ClassicBUGS, WinBUGS, OpenBUGS and MultiBUGS. MultiBUGS is built on the existing algorithms and tools in OpenBUGS and WinBUGS, which are no longer developed, and implements parallelization to speed up computation. Several R packages are available, R2MultiBUGS acts as an interface to MultiBUGS, while Nimble is an extension of the BUGS language.

Alternative implementations of the BUGS language include JAGS and Stan.

== See also ==
- Spike and slab variable selection
- Bayesian structural time series
