= Durk Kingma =

Dutch computer scientist

- Website: dpkingma.com

Diederik P. "Durk" Kingma (1983) is a Dutch computer scientist and businessman. He is a co-founder of OpenAI and currently employed by Anthropic. Earlier he worked at Google and worked on generative AI, specifically text-to-image models.

Durk completed his MSc at Utrecht University in 2009 and completed his PhD at the University of Amsterdam in 2013, where he was supervised by Max Welling. His PhD work included the variational autoencoder (VAE) and the widely used Adam optimizer.
