= Karl J. Friston =

British neuroscientist (born 1959)

Karl Friston
- Born: Karl John Friston; 12 July 1959 (age 67); York, England
- Education: Gonville and Caius College, Cambridge (BA, 1980)
- Known for: Statistical parametric mapping, voxel-based morphometry, dynamic causal modelling, free energy principle, active inference
- Spouse: Ann Elisabeth Leonard
- Awards: OHBM Young Investigators Award in Human Brain Mapping (1996); Golden Brain Award (2003); FRS (2006); FMedSci; FSB; Weldon Memorial Prize (2013)
- Scientific career
- Fields: Neuroscience, Mathematical and theoretical biology, Variational Bayesian methods, Artificial Intelligence
- Workplaces: University College London
- Website: www.fil.ion.ucl.ac.uk/~karl

Karl John Friston (born 12 July 1959), FRS, is a British neuroscientist and theoretician at University College London. He is an authority on brain imaging and theoretical neuroscience, especially the use of physics-inspired statistical methods to model neuroimaging data and other random dynamical systems. Friston is a key architect of the free energy principle and active inference. In imaging neuroscience he is best known for statistical parametric mapping and dynamic causal modelling. Friston also acts as a scientific advisor to numerous groups in industry.

Friston is one of the most highly cited living scientists and in 2016 was ranked No. 1 by Semantic Scholar in the list of top 10 most influential neuroscientists.

== Early life and education ==
Karl Friston attended the Ellesmere Port Grammar School, later renamed Whitby Comprehensive, from 1970 to 1977. Friston studied natural sciences, physics and psychology at Gonville and Caius College, Cambridge, in 1980, and completed his medical studies at King's College Hospital, London.

== Career ==
Friston subsequently qualified under the Oxford University Rotational Training Scheme in Psychiatry, and is now a professor of neuroscience at University College London. He was a Wellcome Trust Principal Fellow and is currently Scientific Director of the Wellcome Trust Centre for Neuroimaging. He also holds an honorary consultant post at the National Hospital for Neurology and Neurosurgery. He invented statistical parametric mapping: SPM is an international standard for analysing imaging data and rests on the general linear model and random field theory (developed with Keith Worsley). In 1994 his group developed voxel-based morphometry. VBM detects differences in neuroanatomy and is used clinically and as a surrogate in genetic studies.

These technical contributions were motivated by schizophrenia research and theoretical studies of value-learning (with Gerry Edelman). In 1995, this work was formulated as the dysconnection hypothesis of schizophrenia (with Chris Frith). In 2003, Friston invented dynamic causal modelling (DCM), which is used to infer the architecture of distributed systems like the brain. Mathematical contributions include Variational Laplace and generalized filtering, which use variational Bayesian methods for time-series analysis. Friston is principally known for models of functional integration in the human brain and the principles that underlie neuronal interactions. His main contribution to theoretical neurobiology is a variational free energy principle (active inference in the Bayesian brain). According to Google Scholar, Friston's h-index is 291.

In 2020, Friston applied dynamic causal modelling as a systems biology approach to epidemiological modelling. He subsequently became a member of Independent SAGE, an independent, public-facing alternative to the COVID-19 pandemic government advisory body Scientific Advisory Group for Emergencies.

He is associated with REBUS, a neurological model of serotonergic psychedelics.

== Awards and achievements ==
In 1996, Friston received the first Young Investigators Award in Human Brain Mapping, and was elected a Fellow of the Academy of Medical Sciences (1999) in recognition of contributions to the bio-medical sciences. In 2000 he was President of the international Organization for Human Brain Mapping. In 2003 he was awarded the Minerva Golden Brain Award and was elected a Fellow of the Royal Society in 2006 and received a Collège de France Medal in 2008. His nomination for the Royal Society reads

Karl Friston pioneered and developed the single most powerful technique for analysing the results of brain imaging studies and unravelling the patterns of cortical activity and the relationship of different cortical areas to one another. Currently over 90% of papers published in brain imaging use his method (SPM or Statistical Parametric Mapping) and this approach is now finding more diverse applications, for example, in the analysis of EEG and MEG data. His method has revolutionised studies of the human brain and given us profound insights into its operations. None has had as major an influence as Friston on the development of human brain studies in the past twenty-five years.

Friston became a Fellow of the Royal Society of Biology in 2012, received the Weldon Memorial Prize and Medal in 2013 for contributions to mathematical biology and was elected as a member of EMBO in 2014 and the Academia Europaea in 2015. He was the 2016 recipient of the Charles Branch Award for unparalleled breakthroughs in Brain Research and the Glass Brain Award from the Organization for Human Brain Mapping. He holds Honorary Doctorates from the universities of York, Zurich, Liège and Radboud University.
