= Paul Duan =

French social entrepreneur

Paul Duan jr
- Born: July 1992 (age 33); Trappes, France
- Education: Paris Institute of Political Studies, Sorbonne University, University of California, Berkeley
- Occupation: social entrepreneur
- Website: https://www.bayesimpact.org/en/

Paul Duan (born in July 1992) is a French social entrepreneur, founder of the NGO Bayes Impact.

== Early life ==
Paul Duan was born in 1992 in Trappes to Chinese immigrant parents. He was educated in Buc at a Franco-German high school, the Deutsch-Französisches Gymnasium in Buc.

He went on to study a mixture of mathematics, economics and political science at Berkeley, the Sorbonne University, and Sciences Po, where he delivered the school's commencement speech in 2017.

Paul Duan started his career as a data scientist of Eventbrite, a Silicon Valley event management and ticketing start up.

== Bayes Impact ==
In 2014, Paul Duan left his job as a Silicon Valley engineer to start Bayes Impact. Bayes Impact was one of the first non-profits to be admitted to Y Combinator, a Silicon Valley technology incubators.

Since then, Paul Duan and his team have worked on multiple projects throughout the world, ranging from helping microfinance institutions operating in Africa reduce the cost of their loans, to launching an online platform in partnership with the California Department of Justice to collect police use-of-force data from more than 800 police agencies.

Since 2016, Bayes Impact's main focus is Bob, an online and open-source platform that uses artificial intelligence to provide data-driven, personalized advice to unemployed individuals in France to help them improve their chances. For this project, Paul Duan and his team received support from several French political leaders, including François Hollande, Emmanuel Macron and Myriam El Khomri.

== Other activities ==
In 2016, Paul Duan played a role in creating France's version of the Presidential Innovation Fellowship program with President François Hollande.

Paul Duan is the author of the Citizen-led Public Services manifesto, published in June 2018. The Citizen-led Public Services vision actively encourages public institutions to recognize entrepreneurial projects that uphold public service values; and give them incentives like funding, access to data and distribution networks.

Paul Duan also served as a member of Action Publique 2022, the French government reform group headed by Prime Minister Edouard Philippe.

== Awards ==
In 2015, Paul Duan was recognized as a Forbes 30 under 30.

In 2017, he became the youngest Ashoka fellow in France.

In 2018, Paul Duan won Humanitarian of the Year at the MIT Innovators Under 35 Europe summit.

== Documentary ==
- (in French) Le rêve de Paul Duan, Infrarouge, France 2, September 2018
