= Bayes Impact =

Non-profit organization

- Type: Non-profit organization
- Industry: Social entrepreneurship
- Founded: 2014; 12 years ago
- Founder: Paul Duan, Eric Liu, Pascal Corpet
- Headquarters: San Francisco, California, United States
- Website: www.bayesimpact.org/en/

Bayes Impact is a non-profit organization, founded by Paul Duan, Eric Liu, and Pascal Corpet. Initially launched in the US in 2014, Bayes Impact started several projects throughout the world and especially in Europe.

Bayes Impact's mission is to use technology (artificial intelligence, data science) to tackle social issues at scale.

Bayes Impact's slogan is "Empowering people at scale".

== History ==
Launched in April 2014 in San Francisco, a few months later Bayes Impact was one of the first nonprofits to be admitted to Y Combinator, one of the Silicon Valley's most famous seed accelerator.

The same year, Bayes Impact helped Zidisha, a microfinance institution operating in Africa, to provide more affordable loans by reducing frauds.

In 2016, Bayes Impact launched an online platform (URSUS) in partnership with the California Department of Justice to improve transparency on law enforcement agencies use of violence against civilians. URSUS collects police use-of-force data and is available in more than 800 police agencies.

In November 2016, the NGO launched Bob (formerly known as Bob Emploi) in France. Bob is an online, open-source and free platform that uses artificial intelligence to provide data-driven, personalized advice to unemployed individuals in France to help them improve their chances. With Bob, Bayes Impact has made a partnership with Pôle emploi, France's unemployment agency. In July 2019, Bob had provided advice to close to 200,000 jobseekers.

In the US, Bayes Impact also took part in research regarding care pathways of Medicare beneficiaries and on improving ambulances routes with Uber-like predictive algorithms.

== Funding ==
Bayes Impact is a non-profit supported by philanthropy, through individual, corporate or foundation donations. Among Bayes Impact's donors, are the Bill and Melinda Gates Foundation, and Google.org.

== Citizen-led public services ==
In June 2018, Bayes Impact published a manifesto on Citizen-led public services, providing a structure to the organisation's work towards the common good. This manifesto promotes a new social contract, which empowers citizens to lead the way in building a new generation of public services backed by the infrastructure and guarantees provided by governments. This new social contract proposes to empower technological innovation to work for public interest with equal fervor as it currently does for private endeavor.
