= Unconscious inference =

Involuntary aspect of visual perception

In perceptual psychology, unconscious inference (German: unbewusster Schluss), also referred to as unconscious conclusion, is a term coined in 1867 by the German physicist and polymath Hermann von Helmholtz to describe an involuntary, pre-rational and reflex-like mechanism which is part of the formation of visual impressions. While precursory notions have been identified in the writings of Thomas Hobbes, Robert Hooke, and Francis North (especially in connection with auditory perception) as well as in Francis Bacon's Novum Organum, Helmholtz's theory was long ignored or even dismissed by philosophy and psychology. It has since received new attention from modern research, and the work of recent scholars has approached Helmholtz's view.

Elaborate theoretical frameworks concerning unconscious inference have persisted for a thousand years, originating with Ibn al-Haytham, ca. 1030. These theories have enjoyed widespread acceptance for nearly four centuries, beginning with René Descartes' contributions in 1637. In the third and final volume of his Handbuch der physiologischen Optik (1856–1867, translated as Treatise on Physiological Optics in 1920-1925, available here), Helmholtz discussed the psychological effects of visual perception. His first example is that of the illusion of the Sun rotating around the Earth:

Every evening apparently before our eyes the sun goes down behind the stationary horizon, although we are well aware that the sun is fixed and the horizon moves.

== Optical illusions ==
Two sets of arrows that exhibit the Müller-Lyer illusion. The set on the bottom shows that all the shafts of the arrows are of the same length.

We are unable to do away with such optical illusions by convincing ourselves rationally that our eyes have played tricks on us: obstinately and unswervingly, the mechanism follows its own rule and thus wields an imperious mastery over the human mind. While optical illusions are the most obvious instances of unconscious inference, people's perceptions of each other are similarly influenced by such unintended, unconscious conclusions. Helmholtz's second example refers to theatrical performance, arguing that the strong emotional effect of a play results mainly from the viewers' inability to doubt the visual impressions generated by unconscious inference:

An actor who cleverly portrays an old man is for us an old man there on the stage, so long as we let the immediate impression sway us, and do not forcibly recall that the programme states that the person moving about there is the young actor with whom we are acquainted. We consider him as being angry or in pain according as he shows us one or the other mode of countenance and demeanour. He arouses fright or sympathy in us [...]; and the deep-seated conviction that all this is only show and play does not hinder our emotions at all, provided the actor does not cease to play his part. On the contrary, a fictitious tale of this sort, which we seem to enter into ourselves, grips and tortures us more than a similar true story would do when we read it in a dry documentary report.

The mere sight of another person is sufficient to produce an emotional attitude without any reasonable basis whatsoever, yet highly resilient against all rational criticism. Obviously, the impression is based on the spontaneous, spurious attribution of traits - a process we can hardly avoid, for the human eye, so to speak, is incapable of doubt and thus cannot ward off the impression.

The formation of visual impressions, Helmholtz realized, is achieved primarily by unconscious judgments, the results of which "can never once be elevated to the plane of conscious judgments" and thus "lack the purifying and scrutinizing work of conscious thinking". In spite of this, the results of unconscious judgments are so impervious to conscious control, so resistant to contradiction that they are "impossible to get rid of" and "the effect of them cannot be overcome". So whatever impressions this unconscious inference process leads to, they strike "our consciousness as a foreign and overpowering force of nature".

The reason, Helmholtz suggested, lies in the way visual sensory impressions are processed neurologically. The higher cortical centres responsible for conscious deliberation are not involved in the formation of visual impressions. However, as the process is spontaneous and automatic, we are unable to account for just how we arrived at our judgments. Through our eyes, we necessarily perceive things as real, for the results of the unconscious conclusions are interpretations which "are urged on our consciousness, so to speak, as if an external power had constrained us, over which our will has no control".

In recognizing these attitude-formation mechanisms underlying the human processing of nonverbal cues, Helmholtz anticipated developments in science by more than a century. As Daniel Gilbert has pointed out, "Helmholtz presaged many current thinkers not only by postulating the existence of such [unconscious inferential] operations, but also by describing their general features". At the same time, he added, it is "probably fair to say that Helmholtz's ideas about the social inference process have exerted no impact whatsoever on social psychology". Indeed, psychologists have largely felt that Helmholtz had fallen prey to an error in reasoning. As Edwin G. Boring summed up the debate, "Since an inference is ostensibly a conscious process and can therefore be neither unconscious nor immediate, [Helmholtz's] view was rejected as self-contradictory". However, several recent authors have since approached Helmholtz's conception under a variety of headings, such as "snap judgments", "nonconscious social information processing", "spontaneous trait inference", "people as flexible interpreters", and "unintended thought". Siegfried Frey has pointed out the revolutionary quality of Helmholtz's proposition that it is from the perceiver, not the actor, whence springs the meaning-attribution process performed when we interpret a nonverbal stimulus:

By failing to distinguish appearance from reality, the psychology of expression merely perpetuated a fallacy deeply ingrained in everyday language: with unswerving belief in our perceptions, we routinely call the other person’s expression what is, in plain truth, our own impression of her or him.

== Influences in current computer science and psychology ==
=== The Helmholtz machine ===
Work in computer science has made use of Helmholtz's ideas of unconscious inference by suggesting the cortex contains a generative model of the world. They develop a statistical method for discovering the structure inherent in a set of patterns:

Following Helmholtz, we view the human perceptual system as a statistical inference engine whose function is to infer the probable causes of sensory input. We show that a device of this kind can learn how to perform these inferences without requiring a teacher to label each sensory input vector with its underlying causes.

=== Free energy principle ===
The Free energy principle provides an explanation for embodied perception in neuroscience and tries to explain how biological systems maintain order by restricting themselves to a limited number of states or beliefs about hidden states in their environment. A biological system performs active inference in sampling action outcomes to maximise the evidence for its model of the world:

The notion that self-organising biological systems – like a cell or brain – can be understood as minimising variational free energy is based upon Helmholtz’s observations on unconscious inference and subsequent treatments in psychology and machine learning.
