= Bayesian history matching =

Bayesian history matching is a statistical method for calibrating complex computer models. The equations inside many scientific computer models contain parameters which have a true value, but that true value is often unknown; history matching is one technique for learning what these parameters could be.

The name originates from the oil industry, where it refers to any technique for making sure oil reservoir models match up with historical oil production records. Since then, history matching has been widely used in many areas of science and engineering, including galaxy formation, disease modelling, climate science, and traffic simulation.

The basis of history matching is to use observed data to rule-out any parameter settings which are implausible. Since computer models are often too slow to individually check every possible parameter setting, this is usually done with the help of an emulator. For a set of potential parameter settings $\boldsymbol\theta$, their implausibility $I(\boldsymbol\theta)$ can be calculated as:

$$I(\boldsymbol\theta) = \frac{|E[f(\boldsymbol\theta)] - y|}{\sqrt{\mathop{\rm var}[f(\boldsymbol\theta)]}}$$

where $E[f(\boldsymbol\theta)]$ is the expected output of the computer model aiming to match observations $y$, and $\mathop{\rm var}[f(\boldsymbol\theta)]$ represents the uncertainties around the computer model output for that parameter setting. In other words, a parameter setting is scored based on how different the computer model output is to the real world observations, relative to how much uncertainty there is.

For computer models that output only one value, an implausibility of 3 is considered a good threshold for rejecting parameter settings. For computer models which output more than one output, other thresholds can be used. A key component of history matching is the notion of iterative refocussing, where new computer model simulations can be chosen to better improve the emulator and the calibration, based on preliminary results.
