= Bayes' theorem (disambiguation) =

Bayes' theorem may refer to:

== Theorem ==
- Bayes' theorem - a theorem which expresses how a subjective degree of belief should rationally change to account for evidence. It is named after Thomas Bayes, an English statistician who published Divine Benevolence and An Introduction to the Doctrine of Fluxions.

== The application of the theorem ==
- Bayesian theory in E-discovery - the application of Bayes' theorem in legal evidence diagnostics and E-discovery, where it provides a way of updating the probability of an event in the light of new information.
- Bayesian theory in marketing - the application of Bayes' theorem in marketing, where it allows for decision making and market research evaluation under uncertainty and limited data.
