= LaplacesDemon =

Open-source statistical package

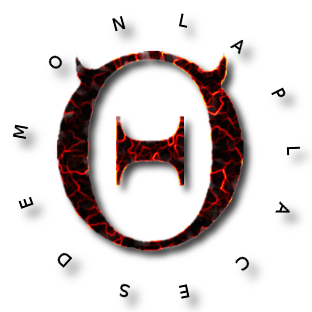
- Developers: Statisticat, LLC.
- Release: 28 December 2010
- Stable release: 15.03.19 / 19 March 2015; 11 years ago
- Written in: R, C++
- Operating system: Unix-like, Microsoft Windows, Mac OS X
- Available in: English
- Type: Statistical package
- License: MIT License
- Website: bayesian-inference.com/software

LaplacesDemon is an open-source statistical package that is intended to provide a complete environment for Bayesian inference. LaplacesDemon has been used in numerous fields. The user writes their own model specification function and selects a numerical approximation algorithm to update their Bayesian model. Some numerical approximation families of algorithms include Laplace's method (Laplace approximation), numerical integration (iterative quadrature), Markov chain Monte Carlo (MCMC), and variational Bayesian methods.

The base package, LaplacesDemon, is written entirely in the R programming language, and is largely self-contained, though it does require the parallel package for high performance computing via parallelism. Big data is also supported. An extension package called LaplacesDemonCpp is in development to provide C++ functionality.

The software was named after the concept of Laplace's demon, which refers to a hypothetical being capable of predicting the universe. Pierre-Simon Laplace alluded to this hypothetical being in the introduction to his Philosophical Essay on Probabilities.

== See also ==
- Bayesian inference
- PyMC
- WinBUGS
