= Credal network =

Probabilistic graphical models based on imprecise probability

Credal networks are probabilistic graphical models based on imprecise probability. Credal networks can be regarded as an extension of Bayesian networks, where credal sets replace probability mass functions in the specification of the local models for the network variables given their parents. As a Bayesian network defines a joint probability mass function over its variables, a credal network defines a joint credal set. The way this credal set is defined depends on the particular notion of independence for imprecise probability adopted. Most of the research on credal networks focused on the case of strong independence. Given strong independence the joint credal set associated to a credal network is called its strong extension. Let $(X_1,\ldots,X_n)$ denote a collection of categorical variables and $G$. If $K(X_i\mid\pi_i)$ is, for each $i=1,\ldots,n$, a conditional credal set over $X_i$, then the strong extension of a credal network is defined as follows:

$$K(X_1,\ldots,X_n)=\mathrm{CH}\{ P(X_1,\ldots,X_n): P(x_1,\ldots,x_n)=\prod_{i=1}^n P(x_i\mid\pi_i) , P(X_i\mid\pi_i) \in K(X_i\mid\pi_i) \}$$

where $\mathrm{CH}$ denotes the convex hull.

== Inference ==
Inference on a credal network is intended as the computation of the bounds of an expectation with respect to its strong extensions. When computing the bounds of a conditional event, inference is called updating. Say that the queried variable $X_q$ and the observed variables are $X_E$, the lower bound to be evaluated is:

$$\underline{P}(x_q\mid x_E)=\min_{P(X_1,\ldots,X_n)\in K(X_1,\ldots,X_n)} \frac{\sum_{X_q,X_E}P(X_1,\ldots,X_n)}{\sum_{X_q}P(X_1,\ldots,X_n)}.$$

Being a generalization of the same problem for Bayesian networks, updating with credal networks is a NP-hard task. Yet a number of algorithms have been specified.

== See also ==
- Imprecise probability
- Credal set
- Bayesian network
