= Comparison of Gaussian process software =

Comparison of statistical analysis software

This is a comparison of statistical analysis software that allows doing inference with Gaussian processes often using approximations.

This article is written from the point of view of Bayesian statistics, which may use a terminology different from the one commonly used in kriging. The next section should clarify the mathematical/computational meaning of the information provided in the table independently of contextual terminology.

== Description of columns ==
This section details the meaning of the columns in the table below.

=== Solvers ===
These columns are about the algorithms used to solve the linear system defined by the prior covariance matrix, i.e., the matrix built by evaluating the kernel.

- Exact: whether generic exact algorithms are implemented. These algorithms are usually appropriate only up to some thousands of datapoints.
- Specialized: whether specialized exact algorithms for specific classes of problems are implemented. Supported specialized algorithms may be indicated as:
  - Kronecker: algorithms for separable kernels on grid data.
  - Toeplitz: algorithms for stationary kernels on uniformly spaced data.
  - Semisep.: algorithms for semiseparable covariance matrices.
  - Sparse: algorithms optimized for sparse covariance matrices.
  - Block: algorithms optimized for block diagonal covariance matrices.
  - Markov: algorithms for kernels which represent (or can be formulated as) a Markov process.
- Approximate: whether generic or specialized approximate algorithms are implemented. Supported approximate algorithms may be indicated as:
  - Sparse: algorithms based on choosing a set of "inducing points" in input space, or more in general imposing a sparse structure on the inverse of the covariance matrix.
  - Hierarchical: algorithms which approximate the covariance matrix with a hierarchical matrix.

=== Input ===
These columns are about the points on which the Gaussian process is evaluated, i.e. $x$ if the process is $f(x)$.

- ND: whether multidimensional input is supported. If it is, multidimensional output is always possible by adding a dimension to the input, even without direct support.
- Non-real: whether arbitrary non-real input is supported (for example, text or complex numbers).

=== Output ===
These columns are about the values yielded by the process, and how they are connected to the data used in the fit.

- Likelihood: whether arbitrary non-Gaussian likelihoods are supported.
- Errors: whether arbitrary non-uniform correlated errors on datapoints are supported for the Gaussian likelihood. Errors may be handled manually by adding a kernel component, this column is about the possibility of manipulating them separately. Partial error support may be indicated as:
  - iid: the datapoints must be independent and identically distributed.
  - Uncorrelated: the datapoints must be independent, but can have different distributions.
  - Stationary: the datapoints can be correlated, but the covariance matrix must be a Toeplitz matrix, in particular this implies that the variances must be uniform.

=== Hyperparameters ===
These columns are about finding values of variables which enter somehow in the definition of the specific problem but that can not be inferred by the Gaussian process fit, for example parameters in the formula of the kernel.

- Prior: whether specifying arbitrary hyperpriors on the hyperparameters is supported.
- Posterior: whether estimating the posterior is supported beyond point estimation, possibly in conjunction with other software.

If both the "Prior" and "Posterior" cells contain "Manually", the software provides an interface for computing the marginal likelihood and its gradient w.r.t. hyperparameters, which can be feed into an optimization/sampling algorithm, e.g., gradient descent or Markov chain Monte Carlo.

=== Linear transformations ===
These columns are about the possibility of fitting datapoints simultaneously to a process and to linear transformations of it.

- Deriv.: whether it is possible to take an arbitrary number of derivatives up to the maximum allowed by the smoothness of the kernel, for any differentiable kernel. Example partial specifications may be the maximum derivability or implementation only for some kernels. Integrals can be obtained indirectly from derivatives.
- Finite: whether finite arbitrary $\mathbb R^n \to \mathbb R^m$ linear transformations are allowed on the specified datapoints.
- Sum: whether it is possible to sum various kernels and access separately the processes corresponding to each addend. It is a particular case of finite linear transformation but it is listed separately because it is a common feature.

== Comparison table ==
Name	License	Language	Solvers			Input		Output		Hyperparameters		Linear transformations			Name
Name	License	Language	Exact	Specialized	Approximate	ND	Non-real	Likelihood	Errors	Prior	Posterior	Derivative	Finite	Sum	Name
PyMC	Apache	Python	Yes	Kronecker	Sparse	ND	No	Any	Correlated	Yes	Yes	No	Yes	Yes	PyMC
Stan	BSD, GPL	custom	Yes	No	No	ND	No	Any	Correlated	Yes	Yes	No	Yes	Yes	Stan
scikit-learn	BSD	Python	Yes	No	No	ND	Yes	Bernoulli	Uncorrelated	Manually	Manually	No	No	No	scikit-learn
fbm	Free	C	Yes	No	No	ND	No	Bernoulli, Poisson	Uncorrelated, Stationary	Many	Yes	No	No	Yes	fbm
GPML	BSD	MATLAB	Yes	No	Sparse	ND	No	Many	i.i.d.	Manually	Manually	No	No	No	GPML
GPstuff	GNU GPL	MATLAB, R	Yes	Markov	Sparse	ND	No	Many	Correlated	Many	Yes	First RBF	No	Yes	GPstuff
GPy	BSD	Python	Yes	No	Sparse	ND	No	Many	Uncorrelated	Yes	Yes	No	No	No	GPy
GPflow	Apache	Python	Yes	No	Sparse	ND	No	Many	Uncorrelated	Yes	Yes	No	No	No	GPflow
GPyTorch	MIT	Python	Yes	Toeplitz, Kronecker	Sparse	ND	No	Many	Uncorrelated	Yes	Yes	First RBF	Manually	Manually	GPyTorch
GPvecchia	GNU GPL	R	Yes	No	Sparse, Hierarchical	ND	No	Exponential family	Uncorrelated	No	No	No	No	No	GPvecchia
pyGPs	BSD	Python	Yes	No	Sparse	ND	Graphs, Manually	Bernoulli	i.i.d.	Manually	Manually	No	No	No	pyGPs
gptk	BSD	R	Yes	Block?	Sparse	ND	No	Gaussian	No	Manually	Manually	No	No	No	gptk
celerite	MIT	Python, Julia, C++	No	Semisep. (Note: celerite implements only a specific subalgebra of kernels which can be solved in $O(n)$.)	No	1D	No	Gaussian	Uncorrelated	Manually	Manually	No	No	No	celerite
george	MIT	Python, C++	Yes	No	Hierarchical	ND	No	Gaussian	Uncorrelated	Manually	Manually	No	No	Manually	george
neural-tangents (Note: neural-tangents is a specialized package for infinitely wide neural networks.)	Apache	Python	Yes	Block, Kronecker	No	ND	No	Gaussian	No	No	No	No	No	No	neural-tangents
DiceKriging	GNU GPL	R	Yes	No	No	ND	No?	Gaussian	Uncorrelated	SCAD RBF	MAP	No	No	No	DiceKriging
OpenTURNS	GNU LGPL	Python, C++	Yes	No	No	ND	No	Gaussian	Uncorrelated	Manually (no grad.)	MAP	No	No	No	OpenTURNS
UQLab	Proprietary	MATLAB	Yes	No	No	ND	No	Gaussian	Correlated	No	MAP	No	No	No	UQLab
ooDACE	Proprietary	MATLAB	Yes	No	No	ND	No	Gaussian	Correlated	No	MAP	No	No	No	ooDACE
DACE	Proprietary	MATLAB	Yes	No	No	ND	No	Gaussian	No	No	MAP	No	No	No	DACE
GpGp	MIT	R	No	No	Sparse	ND	No	Gaussian	i.i.d.	Manually	Manually	No	No	No	GpGp
SuperGauss	GNU GPL	R, C++	No	Toeplitz (Note: SuperGauss implements a superfast Toeplitz solver with computational complexity $O(n\log^2n)$.)	No	1D	No	Gaussian	No	Manually	Manually	No	No	No	SuperGauss
STK	GNU GPL	MATLAB	Yes	No	No	ND	No	Gaussian	Uncorrelated	Manually	Manually	No	No	Manually	STK
GSTools	GNU LGPL	Python	Yes	No	No	ND	No	Gaussian	Yes	Yes	Yes	Yes	No	No	GSTools
PyKrige	BSD	Python	Yes	No	No	2D,3D	No	Gaussian	i.i.d.	No	No	No	No	No	PyKrige
GPR	Apache	C++	Yes	No	Sparse	ND	No	Gaussian	i.i.d.	Some, Manually	Manually	First	No	No	GPR
celerite2	MIT	Python	No	Semisep.	No	1D	No	Gaussian	Uncorrelated	Manually (Note: celerite2 has a PyMC3 interface.)	Manually	No	No	Yes	celerite2
SMT	BSD	Python	Yes	No	Sparse, PODI (Note: PODI (Proper Orthogonal Decomposition + Interpolation) is an approximation for high-dimensional multioutput regressions. The regression function is lower-dimensional than the outcomes, and the subspace is chosen with the PCA of the (outcome, dependent variable) data. Each principal component is modeled with an a priori independent Gaussian process.), other	ND	No	Gaussian	i.i.d.	Some	Some	First	No	No	SMT
GPJax	Apache	Python	Yes	No	Sparse	ND	Graphs	Bernoulli	No	Yes	Yes	No	No	No	GPJax
Stheno	MIT	Python	Yes	Low rank	Sparse	ND	No	Gaussian	i.i.d.	Manually	Manually	Approximate	No	Yes	Stheno
Egobox-gp	Apache	Rust	Yes	No	Sparse	ND	No	Gaussian	i.i.d.	No	MAP	First	No	No	Egobox-gp
Name	License	Language	Exact	Specialized	Approximate	ND	Non-real	Likelihood	Errors	Prior	Posterior	Derivative	Finite	Sum	Name
Name	License	Language	Solvers			Input		Output		Hyperparameters		Linear transformations			Name
