= Lewandowski-Kurowicka-Joe distribution =

Continuous multivariate probability distribution

- Notation: $\operatorname{LKJ}(\eta)$
- Parameters: $\eta\in (0, \infty)$ (shape)
- Support: $\mathbf{R}$ is a positive-definite matrix with unit diagonal
- Mean: the identity matrix

In probability theory and Bayesian statistics, the Lewandowski-Kurowicka-Joe distribution, often referred to as the LKJ distribution, is a probability distribution over positive definite symmetric matrices with unit diagonals.

== Introduction ==
The LKJ distribution was first introduced in 2009 in a more general context by Daniel Lewandowski, Dorota Kurowicka, and Harry Joe. It is an example of the vine copula, an approach to constrained high-dimensional probability distributions.

The distribution has a single shape parameter $\eta$ and the probability density function for a $d\times d$ matrix $\mathbf{R}$ is

$$p(\mathbf{R}; \eta) = C \times [\det(\mathbf{R})]^{\eta-1}$$

with normalizing constant $C=2^{\sum_{k=1}^{d-1} (2\eta - 2 +d - k)(d-k)}\prod_{k=1}^{d-1}\left[B\left(\eta + (d-k-1)/2, \eta + (d-k-1)/2\right)\right]^{d-k}$, a complicated expression including a product over Beta functions. For $\eta=1$, the distribution is uniform over the space of all correlation matrices; i.e. the space of positive definite matrices with unit diagonal.

== Usage ==
The LKJ distribution is commonly used as a prior for correlation matrix in Bayesian hierarchical modeling. Bayesian hierarchical modeling often tries to make an inference on the covariance structure of the data, which can be decomposed into a scale vector and correlation matrix. Instead of the prior on the covariance matrix such as the inverse-Wishart distribution, LKJ distribution can serve as a prior on the correlation matrix along with some suitable prior distribution on the scale vector. It has been implemented in several probabilistic programming languages, including Stan and PyMC.
