= Hannu Toivonen (professor) =

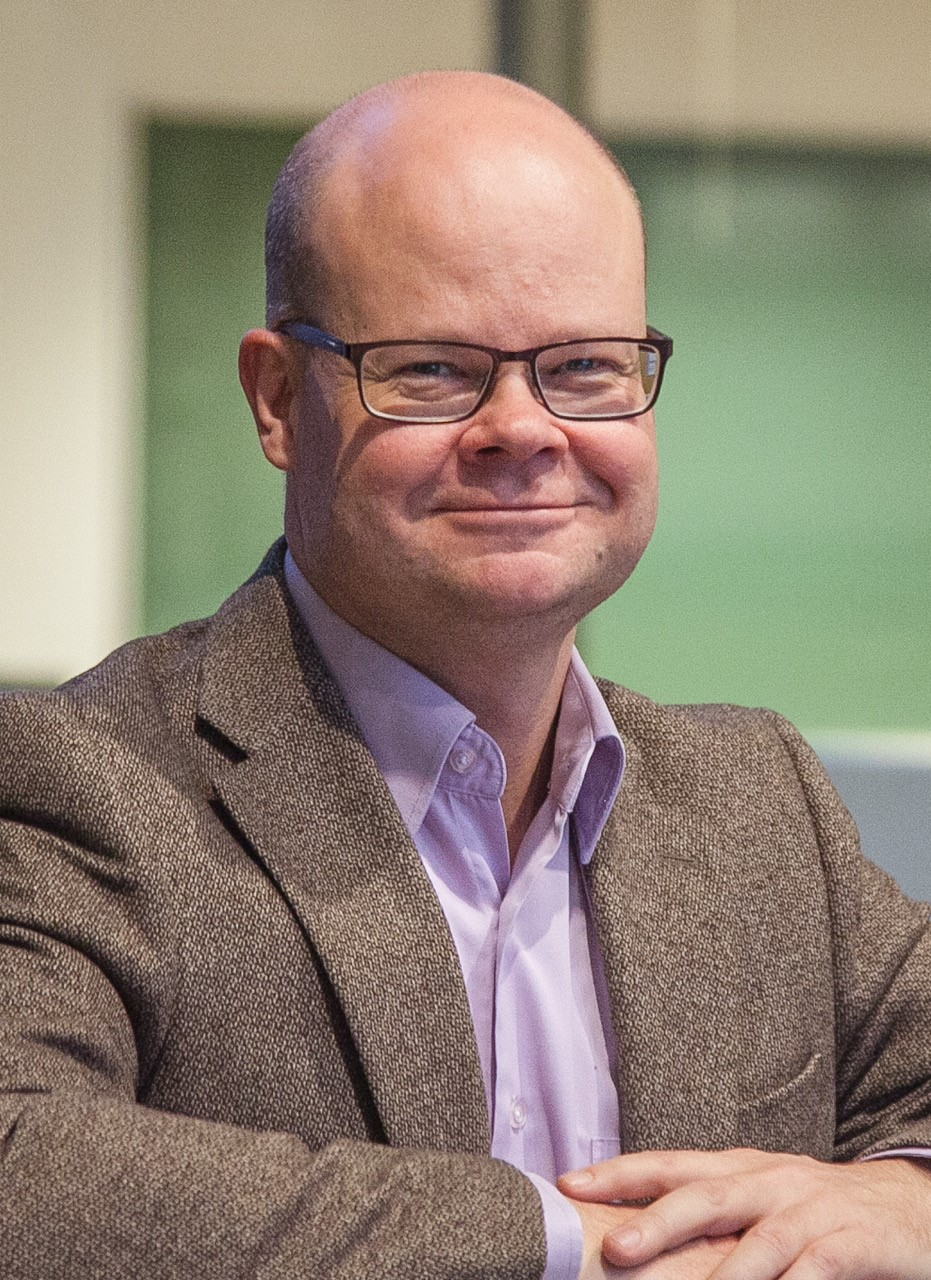
Professor Hannu Toivonen, University of Helsinki, Finland

Hannu Tauno Tapani Toivonen (born 1967 in Helsinki) is a Finnish computer scientist and professor at the University of Helsinki.

== Research and teaching ==
Hannu Toivonen's research area is artificial intelligence and data science, especially data mining and computational creativity, along with their applications. He has chaired the Programme Committees of The International Conference on Computational Creativity in 2015 and 2026, and the Programme Committee of the IEEE International Conference on Data Mining (ICDM) in 2014.

== Publications ==
Hannu Toivonen has published over 200 scientific articles, which have been referenced over 28,000 times in total. The most referenced articles primarily discuss the methods and theory of data mining; other referenced articles include material on context-aware mobile applications, probabilistic logic programming, paleoecology, and gene mapping. Toivonen holds 10 patents.

Toivonen's popular science book on AI has been published in Finnish ("Mitä tekoäly on? 100 kysymystä ja vastausta", 2023), Swedish ("100 frågor om AI", 2025), and German ("Was ist künstliche Intelligenz?", 2025).

== Career ==
Hannu Toivonen completed his PhD on data mining in 1996. He has carried out research for Nokia in 1990–1993 and 1999–2003, and at the University of Helsinki 1993–1999 and 2002 onwards.

Toivonen has been a professor of computer science at the University of Helsinki since 2002. In 2005–2006, he visited the Albert Ludwig University of Freiburg, Germany. In 2025, he visited five Belgian universities (VUB, KU Leuven, UAntwerp, UGent, UCLouvain) as Francqui International Professor. Toivonen was head of the Department of Computer Science in 2007–2009 and vice-dean for academic affairs of the Faculty of Science in 2018–2021.

== Honours ==
- Knight, First Class, of the Order of the White Rose of Finland.
- Member of the Finnish Academy of Science and Letters.
- Member of the Finnish Academy of Technical Sciences.
- Honorary member of the computer science student association TKO-äly ry.
- European Heritage Award (NewsEye consortium).
