= LKJ =

LKJ, or lkj, may refer to:

- Linton Kwesi Johnson (born 1952), Jamaican dub poet and activist
- lkj, the ISO 639-3 code for the Remun language in Sarawak, Malaysia
- The Lewandowski-Kurowicka-Joe distribution in statistics
