= Bambi (software) =

Python package

- Original author: Bambinos
- Release: May 15, 2016
- Written in: Python
- Operating system: Unix-like, macOS, Windows
- Platform: Intel x86 – 32-bit, x64
- Type: Statistical package
- License: MIT License
- Website: bambinos.github.io/bambi/
- Repository: github.com/bambinos/bambi

Bambi is a high-level Bayesian model-building interface written in Python. It works with the PyMC probabilistic programming framework. Bambi provides an interface to build and solve Bayesian generalized (non-)linear multivariate multilevel models.

Bambi is an open source project, developed by the community and is an affiliated project of NumFOCUS.

== Etymology ==
Bambi is an acronym for BAyesian Model-Building Interface.

== Library features ==
- Model specification using a Wilkison-like formula style
- Bayesian inference using MCMC and Variational Inference methods
- Interface with ArviZ, as Bambi returns an InferenceData object
- Model interpretation via conditional adjusted comparisons, predictions, and slopes
- A wide array of response families
- Default priors that the users can modify if needed

== See also ==
- Stan, a probabilistic programming language for statistical inference written in C++
