= Patents for Humanity =

U.S. Patent Office awards program

Patents for Humanity is an awards program run by the United States Patent and Trademark Office.

The Obama administration started the initiative in February 2012 to encourage new innovations to solve global development challenges.

== 2018 winners ==
- Medtronic for creating a portable, low-water kidney dialysis machine for potential use in a wide variety of care settings, including those that lack the infrastructure required for traditional dialysis.
- U.S. National Institutes of Health for creating a low-cost, temperature tolerant rotavirus vaccine for use in developing countries, with 3.8 million doses ordered by the government of India’s childhood immunization program.
- Little Sparrows Technologies for creating a portable low-cost phototherapy device for treating jaundice in infants, which causes 100,000 newborn deaths a year.
- Kinnos Inc. for creating time-sensitive color chemicals to ensure proper disinfection procedures by health workers in Ebola treatment centers and other health care settings.
- Russell Crawford for creating tools for low-cost drilling of water wells to reach deep aquifers free from soil contaminants.
- Brooklyn Bridge to Cambodia Inc. for creating an affordable rice planting device that helps Cambodian farmers improve their crop yields, and which minimizes the number of farmers, mostly women, who have to work in the most exhausting and unhealthy conditions.
- Solight Design for designing a portable solar light that has been distributed to over 200,000 people worldwide including many in refugee camps.
- Sanivation LLC. for designing a waste processing plant that transforms human waste into sanitary briquettes that replace wood and charcoal for heating and cooking, with four plants serving 10,000 people in Kenya by the end of the year.
- Because International for distributing 180,000 pairs of resizable shoes in over 95 countries, with local manufacturing taking place in Ethiopia and plans for Haiti and Kenya.

== 2016 winners ==
Drugs & Vaccines

- U.S. Food & Drug Administration (FDA) for creating a better meningitis vaccine production method.

Medical Diagnostics

- Case Western Reserve University (CWRU) for designing a rapid, accurate, low-cost malaria diagnostic test. The Magneto-Optical Detection (MOD) device can be ten times cheaper per test than the current standard and can be run by ordinary caregivers with minimal training.
- GestVision for developing a rapid, affordable urine test to diagnose preeclampsia in low-resource settings.

Medical Devices

- Global Good Fund at Intellectual Ventures for designing the Arktek cooler, which is able to keep vaccines cold for over a month with no power required.

== 2015 winners ==
Medicine

- Sanofi – for supplying anti-malarial compounds on an at-cost basis to developing countries.
- Novartis AG for innovation in treatments for drug-resistant tuberculosis, donated to the TB Alliance

Sanitation

- American Standard Brands – for SaTo, a safe toilet

Nutrition

- Golden rice – a strain of rice high in beta-carotene to reduce Vitamin A deficiency.
- Nutriset – manufacturer of Plumpy'nut, a peanut-based paste to treat malnutrition.

Energy

- SunPower Energy – rents out solar powered lamps to replace inefficient and expensive fuel burners

Living Standards

- GRIT – Global Research Innovation & Technology – for the Leveraged Freedom Chair, an all-terrain wheelchair.

== 2013 winners ==
Medicine

- Gilead Sciences – for making HIV drugs available in developing countries and using generics manufacturers in Asia and Africa.
- University of California, Berkeley – for developing and licensing lower-cost methods of producing anti-malarial compounds
- SIGN Fracture Care International – for distributing low-cost fracture implants
- Becton Dickinson – for developing a TB diagnosis system and placing 300 machines in developing countries.

Nutrition

- DuPoint Pioneer – for improving strains of sorghum for use in sub-Saharan Africa
- Intermark Partners Strategic Management LLP – for extracting protein and vitamins from waste rice bran

Clean technology

- Procter & Gamble – for distributing water purification packets
- Nokero – for developing solar powered light bulbs and phone chargers

Information Technology

- Sproxil – for developing a system to identify counterfeit drugs with SMS
- Microsoft – for providing machine learning tools to analyze health data (Infer.NET)
