= Leveraged Freedom Chair =

The Leveraged Freedom Chair (LFC) was an all-terrain wheelchair made from bicycle parts.

== History ==
Amos Winter, a PhD graduate from MIT, travelled to Tanzania during his work, and found that conventional wheelchairs are inadequate in areas without wheelchair accessible roads and buildings. He and his students from his mechanical engineering class worked together on the development of the project. The tests of the LFC were conducted in East Africa, Guatemala and India.

== Description ==
In addition to a normal wheelchair push rim, the wheelchair had a lever drivetrain that let the user grip the lever far from the wheel for high torque on rough terrain. The levers could be removed and stored on the chair, allowing it to be used like a normal wheelchair indoors. The wheelchairs were designed to be produced at low cost from commonly available bicycle parts, and to be repaired and maintained at local bicycle shops.

The chair was developed by a group called Global Research Innovation & Technology. The chair was sold at around US $250 to NGOs--less than the price of common wheelchairs.

The LFC made way for the GRIT Freedom Chair, an improved all-terrain wheelchair designed for the developed world. The initial version of the Freedom Chair product launched on Kickstarter with a lowest price point of US$2,195, which sold out.

== Awards ==
- 1st place at the MIT IDEAS Global Challenge
- Wall Street Journal 2010 Technology Innovation Award
- Awarded at the 2012 MassChallenge
- Awarded at the Patents for Humanity award in 2015
