= M. J. Bayarri =

Spanish Bayesian statistician

- Born: María Jesús Bayarri García; September 16, 1956
- Died: August 19, 2014 (aged 57)
- Education: University of Valencia
- Scientific career
- Fields: Bayesian statistics
- Thesis: Contraste bayesiano de modelos probabilísticos (1984)
- Doctoral advisor: José-Miguel Bernardo
- Doctoral students: Anabel Forte

María Jesús (Susie) Bayarri García (September 16, 1956 – August 19, 2014) was a Spanish Bayesian statistician who served as president of the International Society for Bayesian Analysis (1998) and of the Sociedad Española de Biometría (2001–2003).

== Education and career ==
After earning a bachelor's degree in 1976, a master's degree in 1979, and a doctorate in 1984 (in mathematics) from the University of Valencia, Bayarri remained at the university as a faculty member for the rest of her career. After the death of her husband in 1984, she became a Fulbright scholar, and frequently visited the US, becoming an adjunct professor at Duke University.

== Awards and honors ==
She was elected as a fellow of the American Statistical Association and the International Statistical Institute in 1997, of the Institute of Mathematical Statistics in 2008, and in the inaugural class of fellows of the International Society for Bayesian Analysis in 2014. Her publications won the 2005 Frank Wilcoxon Prize, and the Jack Youden Prize in 2008.
