= Robbins lemma =

In statistics, the Robbins lemma, named after Herbert Robbins, states that if X is a random variable having a Poisson distribution with parameter λ, and f is any function for which the expected value E(f(X)) exists, then

$$\operatorname{E}(X f(X - 1)) = \lambda \operatorname{E}(f(X)).$$

Robbins introduced this proposition while developing empirical Bayes methods.
