= Infer.NET =

Microsoft open source library

- Original author: Microsoft Research
- Developers: Microsoft,.NET Foundation
- Release: 2008; 18 years ago
- Stable release: v0.4.2301.0301 / January 3, 2023; 3 years ago
- Written in: C#
- Operating system: Microsoft Windows, macOS, Linux
- Platform: .NET Framework, .NET, Mono
- Type: Machine learning software library
- License: MIT License
- Website: dotnet.github.io/infer/
- Repository: github.com/dotnet/infer

Infer.NET is a free and open source .NET software library for machine learning. It supports running Bayesian inference in graphical models and can also be used for probabilistic programming.

== Overview ==
Infer.NET follows a model-based approach and is used to solve different kinds of machine learning problems including standard problems like classification, recommendation or clustering, customized solutions and domain-specific problems. The framework is used in various different domains such as bioinformatics, epidemiology, computer vision, and information retrieval.

Development of the framework was started by a team at Microsoft's research centre in Cambridge, UK in 2004. It was first released for academic use in 2008 and later open sourced in 2018. In 2013, Microsoft was awarded the USPTO's Patents for Humanity Award in Information Technology category for Infer.NET and the work in advanced machine learning techniques.

Infer.NET is used internally at Microsoft as the machine learning engine in some of their products such as Office, Azure, and Xbox.

The source code is licensed under MIT License and available on GitHub. It is also available as NuGet package.

== See also ==
- Comparison of machine learning software
- Machine learning
- ML.NET
- scikit-learn
