= José-Miguel Bernardo =

Spanish mathematician and statistician

José-Miguel Bernardo Herranz
- Born: 12 March 1950 (age 76); Valencia, Francoist Spain
- Education: University of Valencia (Ph.D.); University College London (Ph.D.)
- Known for: reference prior
- Scientific career
- Fields: Bayesian statistics
- Workplaces: University of Valencia
- Thesis: The Use of Information in the Design and Analysis of Scientific Experimentation (1976)
- Doctoral advisor: Dennis Lindley
- Doctoral students: M. J. Bayarri

José-Miguel Bernardo Herranz (born 12 March 1950) is a Spanish mathematician and statistician. He is a noted Bayesian and known for introducing the concept of reference priors.

Bernardo was born in Valencia, Spain. He received a PhD in mathematics from the University of Valencia in 1974, and a second PhD in statistics from University College London in 1976. Since 1978, he has been a professor of statistics at the University of Valencia.

Bernardo is a Fellow of the American Statistical Association and was founding co-president of the International Society for Bayesian Analysis (ISBA).

== Bibliography ==
- Bernardo, J. M. (1981). Bioestadística: Una Perspectiva Bayesiana. Barcelona: Vicens-Vives. pdf
- Bernardo, J. M. and Smith, A. F. M. (1994). Bayesian Theory. Chichester: Wiley.
