= MassChallenge =

American startup accelerator

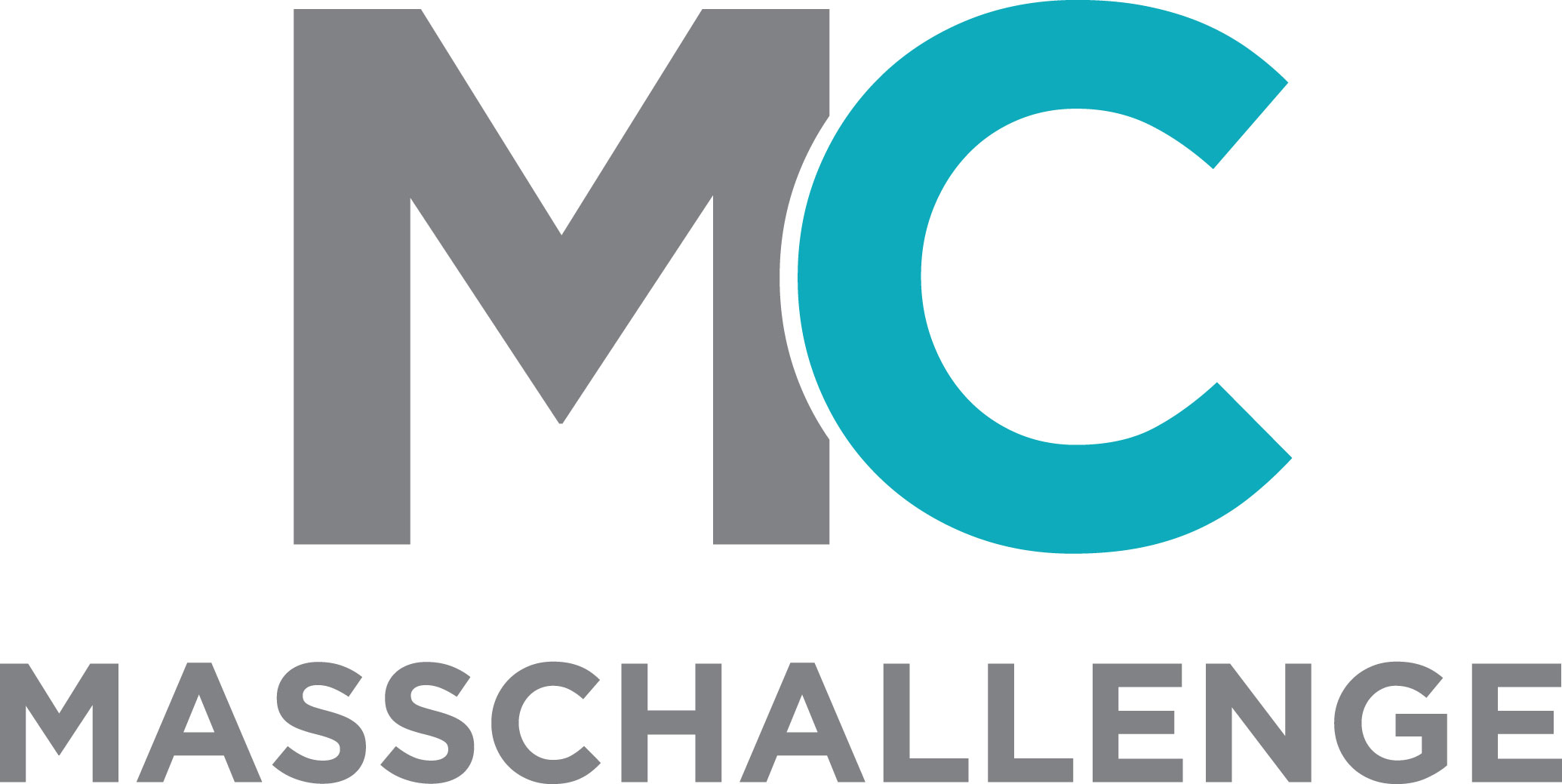
- Formation: 2009
- Founders: John Harthorne; Akhil Nigam
- Type: 501(c)(3)
- Headquarters: Boston, Massachusetts
- Location: Massachusetts, Texas, Israel, London, Switzerland
- Key people: Cait Brumme (CEO)
- Website: masschallenge.org

MassChallenge is a global, zero-equity startup accelerator, founded in Boston, Massachusetts, in 2009.

MassChallenge is headquartered in Boston's Seaport District in the MassMutual Building, and has additional U.S. locations in Texas, as well international locations in Israel and Switzerland.

== History ==
MassChallenge co-founders John Harthorne and Akhil Nigam were working as strategy consultants at Bain & Company during the 2008 financial crisis when they developed MassChallenge. MassChallenge secured early support from successful entrepreneurs like Desh Deshpande and Joe Fallon, the public sector including Thomas Menino the then-Mayor of Boston and the Commonwealth of Massachusetts, and large organizations like The Blackstone Charitable Foundation and Microsoft.

During its first Boston-based cohort in 2010, MassChallenge accelerated 111 startups.

During the mid-2010s, MassChallenge expanded internationally with accelerator programs in the United Kingdom, Israel, and Switzerland.

In 2018, co-founder John Harthorne announced he would step down as chief executive officer of MassChallenge.

In 2019, Siobhan Dullea succeeded co-founder John Harthorne as chief executive officer of MassChallenge.

In 2022, following Dullea's departure to address a family health situation, Cait Brumme became acting chief executive officer. She was officially named chief executive officer in June after serving in the acting role for about six months.

In 2022, MassChallenge established a presence at Pegasus Park in Dallas, expanding its operations in North Texas.

In 2023, MassChallenge became one of five accelerator sites for the Defence Innovation Accelerator for the North Atlantic (DIANA), NATO's startup accelerator for dual-use technologies. MassChallenge collaborated with MIT and Starburst, an aerospace-focused accelerator program, to develop a curriculum for the startups used at all five of the sites.

In 2026, MassChallenge was ranked No. 2 in the United States in TIME and Statista's inaugural ranking of America's Best Incubators and Accelerators.

== Notable alumni ==
- Alkeus Pharmaceuticals, developer of gildeuretinol, an investigational treatment for Stargardt disease.
- Trust & Will, an online estate planning company.
- Spring Health (formerly Spring Care), a mental healthcare company.
- Tomorrow.io (formerly ClimaCell), a weather technology company.
- Oklo, a nuclear technology company.
- JoyTunes, a music app producer
- Drync, a wine mobile app for iOS platforms
- Ginkgo_Bioworks, biotech company
- Her Campus, an online newsmagazine for college women
- Global Research Innovation & Technology, manufacturer of the Leveraged Freedom Chair
- LiquiGlide, a plant-based liquid-impregnated surface coating
- RallyPoint, a professional network for US military members
- Ministry of Supply, a business wear men's fashion brand
- Moneythink, a non-profit organization that places college volunteers in high school classrooms to teach courses in financial literacy and entrepreneurship
