= Stargardt =

Stargardt is a surname. It is likely a Germanized form of a West Slavic toponym such as Stargard, meaning "old town/city". Notable people with the surname include:

- Joseph Abraham Stargardt (1822–1885), German bookseller
- Karl Stargardt (1875–1927), German ophthalmologist
- Nicholas Stargardt (born 1962), Australian historian

== See also ==
- Stargardt disease
- Stargard
