= Ras-interacting protein 1 =

Protein-coding gene in the species Homo sapiens

RASIP1

Identifiers
- Aliases: RASIP1, RAIN, Ras interacting protein 1
- External IDs: OMIM: 609623; MGI: 1917153; HomoloGene: 9847; GeneCards: RASIP1; OMA:RASIP1 - orthologs

Gene location (Human)
Chr.	Chromosome 19 (human)
Band	19q13.33	Start	48,720,585 bp
Band	19q13.33	End	48,740,610 bp

Gene location (Mouse)
Chr.	Chromosome 7 (mouse)
Band	7|7 B3	Start	45,276,912 bp
Band	7|7 B3	End	45,288,517 bp
RNA expression pattern
Bgee	Human / Mouse (ortholog); Top expressed in: right lung; upper lobe of left lung; apex of heart; spleen; subcutaneous adipose tissue; lower lobe of lung; left uterine tube; left ventricle; right auricle of heart; body of uterus / Top expressed in: vascular endothelium; interventricular septum; right lung; left lung; left lung lobe; capillary; lactiferous gland; vasculature of trunk; cardiac muscle tissue of left ventricle; right lung lobe; More reference expression data
BioGPS	n/a
Gene ontology
Molecular function	protein binding; protein homodimerization activity; GTPase binding
Cellular component	perinuclear region of cytoplasm; cytoplasm; Golgi stack; Golgi apparatus; cell-cell junction; protein-containing complex
Biological process	vasculogenesis; regulation of GTPase activity; negative regulation of autophagy; branching morphogenesis of an epithelial tube; angiogenesis; signal transduction; positive regulation of integrin activation; negative regulation of Rho protein signal transduction; negative regulation of membrane permeability; negative regulation of Rho-dependent protein serine/threonine kinase activity
Sources:Amigo / QuickGO
Orthologs
Species	Human	Mouse
Entrez	54922	69903
Ensembl	ENSG00000105538	ENSMUSG00000044562
UniProt	Q5U651	Q3U0S6
RefSeq (mRNA)	NM_017805	NM_028544; NM_027253
RefSeq (protein)	NP_060275	NP_082820
Location (UCSC)	Chr 19: 48.72 – 48.74 Mb	Chr 7: 45.28 – 45.29 Mb
PubMed search
- Wikidata
View/Edit Human	View/Edit Mouse

Ras-interacting protein 1 (Rain), is a protein that in humans is encoded by the RASIP1 gene.

== Function ==
- It is required for the proper formation of vascular structures that develop via both vasculogenesis and angiogenesis.
- Acts as a critical and vascular-specific regulator of GTPase signaling, cell architecture, and adhesion, which is essential for endothelial cell morphogenesis and blood vessel tubulogenesis.
- Regulates the activity of Rho GTPases in part by recruiting ARHGAP29 and suppressing RhoA signaling and dampening ROCK and MYH9 activities in endothelial cells.

== Clinical significance ==
A recent genome-wide association study (GWAS) has found that genetic variations in RASIP1 are associated with late-onset sporadic Alzheimer’s disease (LOAD). However, it's unknown how RASIP1 mutation contributes to disease.
