= Rally Point =

RallyPoint may refer to:

- RallyPoint, a professional networking platform for the US military community
- Rally Point (novel), a fantasy novel by David Sherman
- "Rally Point", an online driving game created by Xform games
- ”Rally Point”, a community video series promoting the Total War games by developer Creative Assembly
