= Ministry of Supply (disambiguation) =

The Ministry of Supply was a department of the UK government from 1939 to 1959.

Ministry of Supply may also refer to:

- Ministry of Supply (clothing), an American business wear fashion brand
- Ministry of Supply (Spain), a department of the Government of Spain 1918–1920
- Ministry of Supply (Sweden), a ministry in Sweden 1939–1950

== See also ==
- Minister of Supply and Services, an office in the Cabinet of Canada 1969–1996
- Minister for Supply (Australia)
- Minister for Supplies, Ireland
- Supply (disambiguation)
