= Gabriele Marranci =

Italian psychoterapist and anthropologist (born 1973)

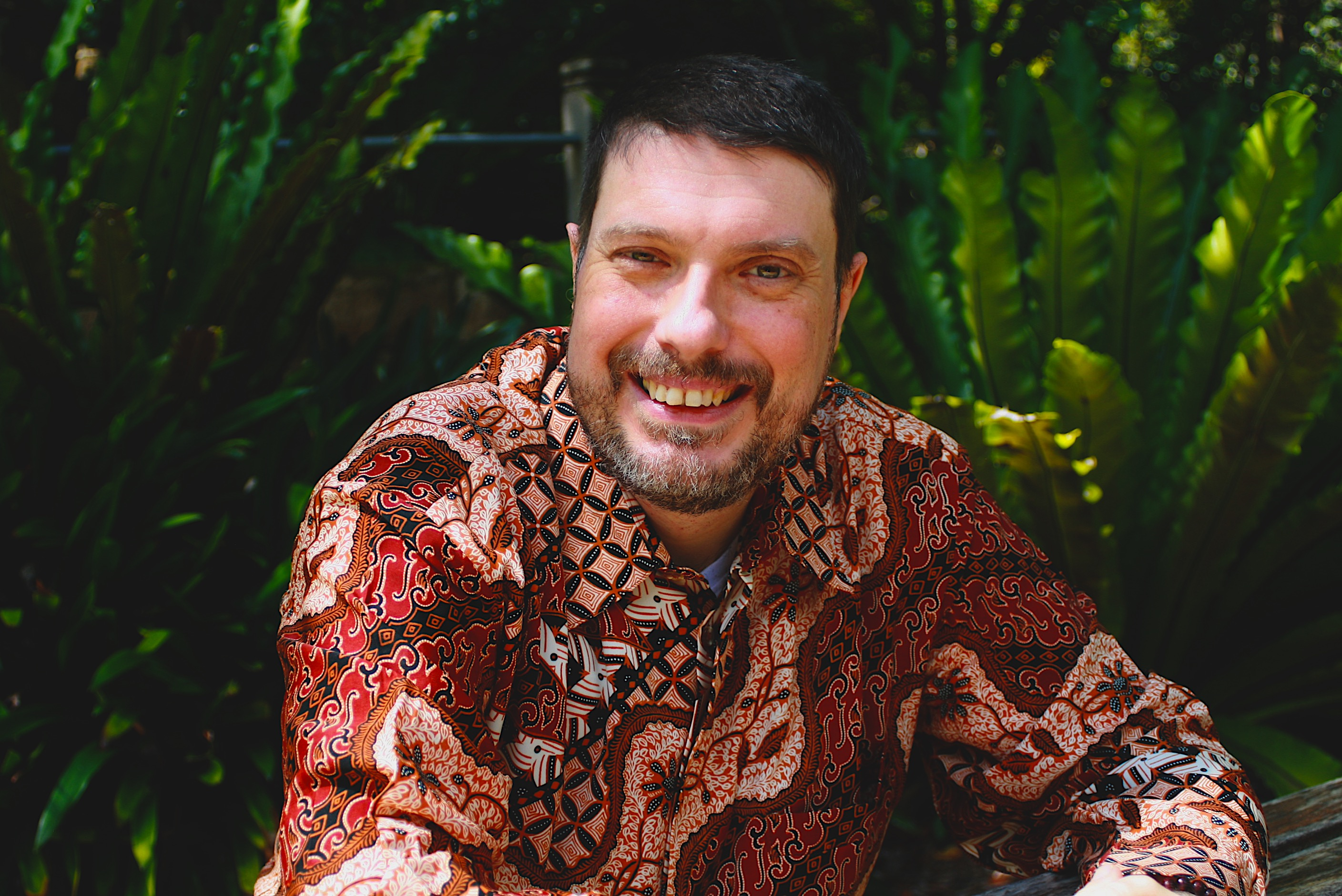
- Dr Marranci, Counsellor
- Born: 4 February 1973 (age 53); Florence, Italy
- Education: Australian Institute of Profesional Counsellors Queen's University Belfast; University of Bologna
- Occupations: Professional registered counsellor, psychotherapist, researcher
- Scientific career
- Workplaces: Act Right Now Counselling; Spring Health; Torrens University; Macquarie University; National University of Singapore; Cardiff University

Gabriele Marranci (born 4 February 1973) is a registered professional counsellor and psychotherapist specialised in Internal Family System Therapy or IFS, Acceptance and commitment therapy or ACT and Somatic psychology. He is a member of the Australian Counselling Association (ACA), and the founder of Act Right Now Counselling Services.

Marranci is a former academic specialising in cognitive and neuro-psychological anthropology, he has worked on identity and self and emotions. He focused on Cognitive Psychology with a deep interest in study emotions and identity processes. He has studied such dynamics in particular among Muslim cultures and societies. He has been the Director of the Study of Contemporary Muslim Lives research hub at Macquarie University. and Senior Honorary Research Fellow at the Centre for the Study of Islam in the UK. He was formerly associate professor at the Department of Sociology at the National University of Singapore. Marranci is the founding editor of the first anthropological journal of Islamic studies, Contemporary Islam: Dynamics of Muslim Life. Together with Bryan Turner he also founded the book series Muslims in Global Societies with Ronald Lukens-Bull serving as an assistant editor.

== Education and academic history ==
During his training as a cognitive psychological and neural anthropologist, Marranci studied the relationship between emotions, gender and musical identity in immigrants of Algerian origin and later wrote about various aspects of raï music among Algerian immigrants in Paris, France, based on his year-long anthropological fieldwork there. Moving beyond an examination of raï in its North African context, Marranci focused upon the development of raï from its beginnings in Algeria to "Beur-raï" in France. He received his MA degree in Anthropology of Music in 1999 at the University of Bologna, Italy and also completed a diploma in piano performance at the Conservatoire Girolamo Frescobaldi, a musical conservatory in Ferrara, Italy, in 1998.

In 2000, Marranci moved to Northern Ireland to study for a Ph.D. in psychological anthropology and neuroanthropology at Queen's University Belfast. His PhD used a neuroanthropological approach and focused on identity formation. Two years later, he became a teaching assistant within the same department. After conducting fieldwork with the Northern Irish Muslim community under the supervision of Kay Milton, he completed his PhD in 2003 with a thesis entitled The Adhan among the Bells: The Muslim Community in Northern Ireland. He published several articles and book chapters based on his fieldwork in Northern Ireland and also used material gathered there to furnish his first two books Jihad Beyond Islam and The Anthropology of Islam with ethnographic examples. From 2003 to 2008, Marranci was lecturer in Religious Studies at the University of Aberdeen.

In 2020, Marranci left his academic position at Macquarie University and retrained as a counsellor and a psychotherapist with the Australian Institute of Professional Counsellors.

== Research ==
Marranci has explored numerous topics concerning Muslims and Islam varying from general concepts such as arts, music, gender, ethnicity, education, political Islam and social issues to more specific ones such as jihad, the ummah and the councilors. His areas of interest further include identity and emotions, urban sociology, Muslim migration/immigration, criminology, fundamentalism, secularisation processes, ethnomusicology, and the relationship between anthropological research and cognitive neuroscience. All of these seemingly highly varied topics, however, are linked to his main social anthropological interest: human identity and self.

=== Singapore ===
Marranci's current research focuses on young Malay Muslims (aged 12–25) and the issues that they may encounter in contemporary Singapore. Based on participant observation and interviews with male and female residents of welfare homes, parents, educators and organizations, his topic investigates the exposure of young Malays to what he terms as ‘global social threats’ and also the effects of a widening generational gap in the context of the recent 2008-2009 economic crisis.

=== England and Scotland ===
Between 2004 and 2007, Marranci conducted in-depth research among Muslims in prison – the longest study of its kind to date. Funded by the British Academy, the Carnegie Trust for the Universities of Scotland and the University of Aberdeen, this research focused on the experience of Muslims in prison in the aftermath of the terrorist attacks of September 11, 2001, and how being behind bars impacted their identity and experience of Islam. Using participant observation as a primary research methodology, Marranci conducted over 170 interviews with current and former Muslim prisoners and their families. This meant taking part in Friday prayers, Islamic lessons, observing imams' activities and spending time with the prisoners in their cells and during their association time – at times for up to 10 hours a day. As far as former prisoners are concerned, this has also included living for a short time with the former prisoners' families and following their lives once released from prison.

Marranci presented some of his research at the 2007 IQRA Trust Annual Lecture at the House of Lords. His research has also attracted attention from newspapers such as The Guardian, Le Figaro, and Daily Times (Pakistan), among others. In addition, he has been interviewed for a documentary for the BBC.

=== Northern Ireland ===
Between 2001 and 2003 Marranci carried out fieldwork among the local Muslim community, primarily in Belfast. His research interests included cultural influences, religious modifications, the concept of ummah, children's education, Muslim associations, community organization, child-parent relationships, identity conflicts, and women. He also studied identity construction among Muslim migrants and their children, proposing an interpretation of the reasons for which Muslims in the West may radicalize or understand jihad as violent struggle. He has published some of this research in Jihad beyond Islam and, along with findings from his research with Muslims in prison, in Understanding Muslim Identity, Rethinking Fundamentalism.

=== Italy ===
Between 1999 and 2000, Marranci studied Muslim immigrant women and their daughters in Pisa. His fieldwork centered on family roles, women's associations, diaspora, myth of return, private vs. public, female genital mutilation in immigration contexts and social relationships.

=== France ===
Between 1998 and 1999, Marranci conducted fieldwork in both Paris and Lyon with first and second-generation Algerian immigrants, focussing on the use of urban space, identity conflicts, cultural expressions, gender, transnationalism and local and global dimensions.

== Selected bibliography ==
- Marranci, G. (2009), Faith, Ideology and Fear: Muslim Identities Within and Beyond Prisons, London and New York: Continuum Books
- Marranci, G. (2009), The Sociology and Anthropology of Islam, in Bryan Turner (ed.) The New Blackwell Companion to the Sociology of Religion, Oxford: Blackwell Publishing.
- Marranci, G. (2009), Understanding Muslim Identity, Rethinking Fundamentalism, London, New York: Palgrave Macmillan.
- Marranci, G. (2008), British Muslims and the British State, in Bryan Turner (ed.), Religious Diversity and Civil Society: A Comparative Analysis, Oxford: Bardwell Press.
- Marranci, G. (2007), The Anthropology of Islam, London and New York: Berg
- Marranci, G. (2007), From the Ethos of Justice to the Ideology of Justice: Understanding Radical Views of Scottish Muslims, in Tahir Abbas (ed.), Islamic Political Radicalism: A European Comparative Perspective, Edinburgh: Edinburgh University Press.
- Marranci, G. (2006), Jihad beyond Islam, London and New York: Berg.
