= Gildeuretinol =

Clinical data
- Other names: ALK-001, KL-49

Identifiers
- IUPAC name: (2E,4E,6E,8E)-7-methyl-3-(trideuteriomethyl)-9-(2,6,6-trimethylcyclohexen-1-yl)nona-2,4,6,8-tetraen-1-ol
- CAS Number: 118139-35-8
- PubChem CID: 169490774
- DrugBank: DB18468
- ChemSpider: 129431929
- UNII: PSZ7W5NR24
- KEGG: D12713
- ChEMBL: ChEMBL5314606

Chemical and physical data
- Formula: C_{20}H_{30}D_{3}O
- Molar mass: 292.500 g·mol^{−1}
- 3D model (JSmol): Interactive image
- SMILES: [2H]C([2H])([2H])/C(=C\CO)/C=C/C=C(\C)/C=C/C1=C(CCCC1(C)C)C
- InChI: InChI=InChI=1S/C20H30O/c1-16(8-6-9-17(2)13-15-21)11-12-19-18(3)10-7-14-20(19,4)5/h6,8-9,11-13,21H,7,10,14-15H2,1-5H3/b9-6+,12-11+,16-8+,17-13+/i2D3; Key:FPIPGXGPPPQFEQ-QZNDTXPVSA-N

Gildeuretinol is an investigational new drug being developed by Alkeus Pharmaceuticals, Inc. for the treatment of retinal diseases, particularly Stargardt disease and geographic atrophy secondary to age-related macular degeneration (AMD). Stargardt disease is caused by a defect in the ABCA4 gene that clears toxic byproducts resulting from the dimerization of vitamin A. Gildeuretinol is new molecular entity designed to reduce the dimerization of vitamin A in the eye without affecting the visual cycle.

Gildeuretinol has received breakthrough therapy, orphan drug and Pediatric Rare Disease designations from the U.S. Food and Drug Administration.
