= ELOVL4 =

Protein-coding gene in humans

Identifiers
- Aliases: ELOVL4, ADMD, CT118, ISQMR, SCA34, STGD2, STGD3, ELOVL fatty acid elongase 4
- External IDs: OMIM: 605512; MGI: 1933331; GeneCards: ELOVL4
Enzyme activity
EC #	BRENDA	ExPASy	KEGG	MetaCyc
2.3.1.199	↗	↗	↗	↗

Gene location (Human)
Chr.	Chromosome 6 (human)
Band	6q14.1	Start	79,914,814 bp
Band	6q14.1	End	79,947,553 bp

Gene location (Mouse)
Chr.	Chromosome 9 (mouse)
Band	9|9 E2	Start	83,660,745 bp
Band	9|9 E2	End	83,688,330 bp
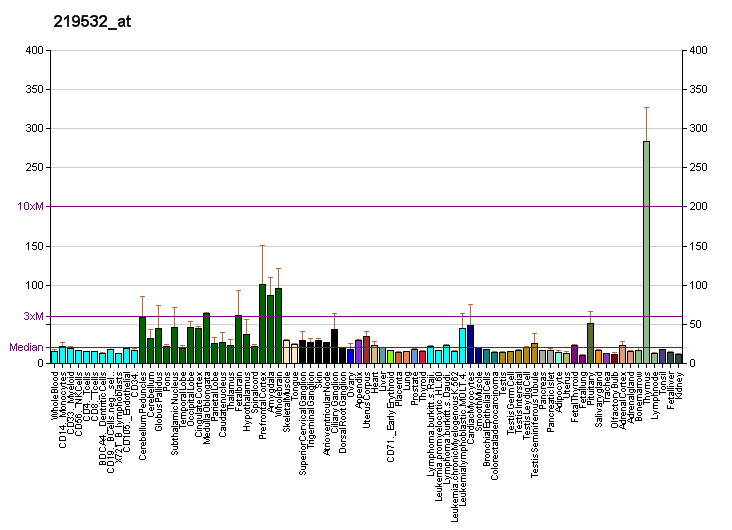
RNA expression pattern
Bgee	Human / Mouse (ortholog); Top expressed in: skin of thigh; skin of arm; vulva; thymus; cerebellar vermis; human penis; skin of abdomen; secondary oocyte; postcentral gyrus; orbitofrontal cortex / Top expressed in: skin of external ear; lip; skin of back; skin of abdomen; neural layer of retina; esophagus; retinal pigment epithelium; umbilical cord; pontine nuclei; anterior horn of spinal cord; More reference expression data
BioGPS	More reference expression data
Gene ontology
Molecular function	transferase activity; G protein-coupled photoreceptor activity; protein binding; 3-oxo-arachidoyl-CoA synthase activity; 3-oxo-cerotoyl-CoA synthase activity; 3-oxo-lignoceronyl-CoA synthase activity; fatty acid elongase activity; very-long-chain 3-ketoacyl-CoA synthase activity
Cellular component	integral component of membrane; integral component of endoplasmic reticulum membrane; endoplasmic reticulum membrane; endoplasmic reticulum; membrane
Biological process	fatty acid biosynthetic process; fatty acid metabolic process; lipid metabolism; fatty acid elongation, saturated fatty acid; very long-chain fatty acid biosynthetic process; detection of visible light; sphingolipid biosynthetic process; fatty acid elongation, monounsaturated fatty acid; fatty acid elongation, polyunsaturated fatty acid; unsaturated fatty acid biosynthetic process; long-chain fatty-acyl-CoA biosynthetic process
Sources:Amigo / QuickGO
Orthologs
Databases	NCBI: entry; OMA: entry
Species	Human	Mouse
Entrez	6785	83603
Ensembl	ENSG00000118402	ENSMUSG00000032262
UniProt	Q9GZR5	Q9EQC4
RefSeq (mRNA)	NM_022726	NM_148941
RefSeq (protein)	NP_073563	NP_683743
Location (UCSC)	Chr 6: 79.91 – 79.95 Mb	Chr 9: 83.66 – 83.69 Mb
PubMed search
- Wikidata
View/Edit Human	View/Edit Mouse

Elongation of very long chain fatty acids protein 4 is a protein that in humans is encoded by the ELOVL4 gene.

ELOVL4 is a member of a large family of fatty acid elongases (ELO) that catalyzes the rate-limiting step in the elongation of long chain fatty acids (LC-FA) into very long-chain saturated (VLC-SFA) and polyunsaturated (VLC-PUFA) fatty acids, collectively known as VLC-FA (very long chain fatty acid). ELOVL4 and its products are found in the brain, skin, retina, meibomian glands, testes and sperm. Known mutations of ELOVL4 in humans cause diseases such as Autosomal Dominant Stargardt-like Macular Dystrophy (STGD3), spinocerebellar ataxia-34 (SCA34), skin deformities and seizures.

== See also ==
- Stargardt disease
