= Craig Breslow =

American baseball player and executive (born 1980)

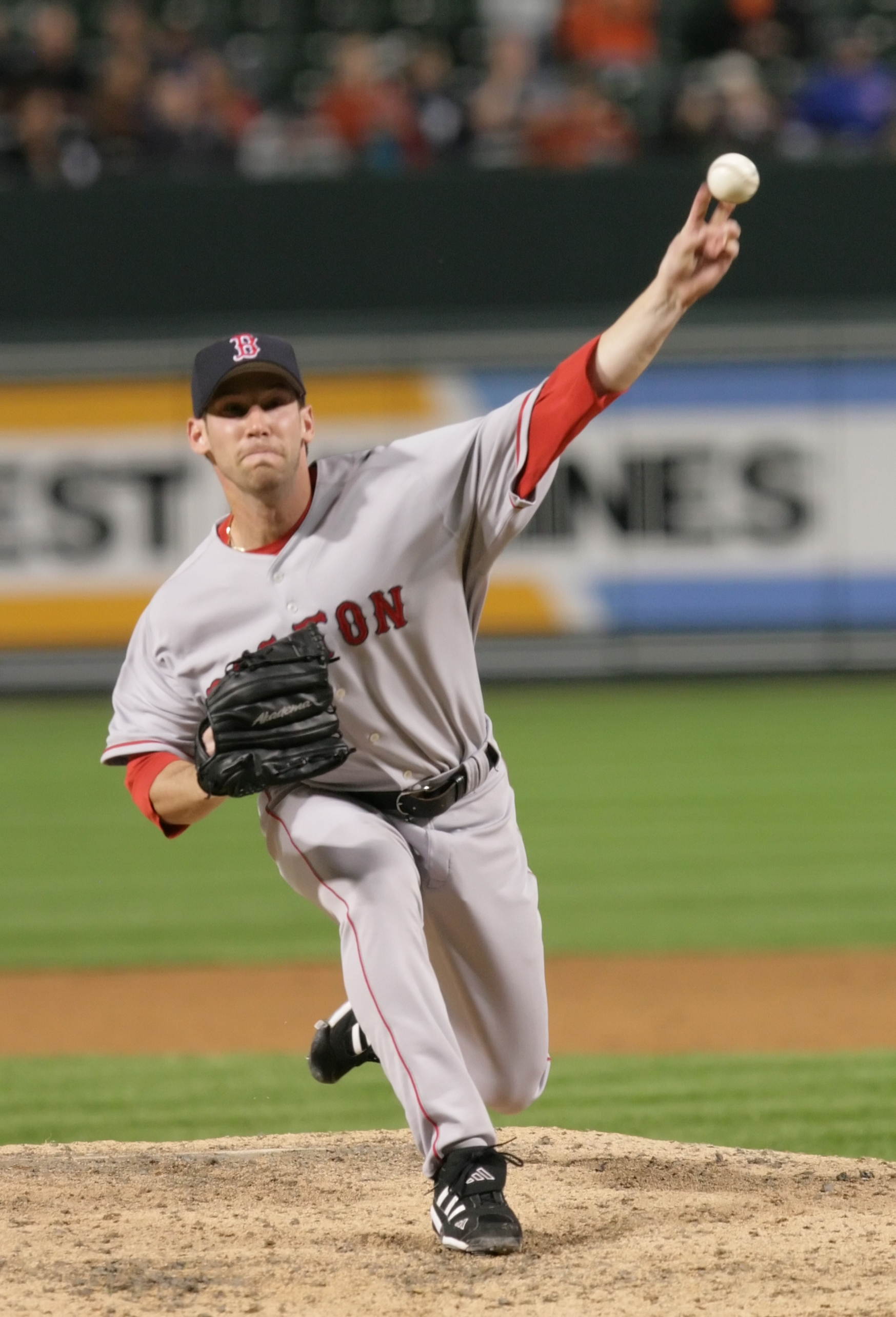
- Breslow with the Boston Red Sox in 2006

Boston Red Sox
- President of baseball operations / Pitcher
- Born: August 8, 1980 (age 46); New Haven, Connecticut, U.S.
- Batted: Left Threw: Left

MLB debut
- July 23, 2005, for the San Diego Padres

Last MLB appearance
- September 28, 2017, for the Cleveland Indians

MLB statistics
- Win–loss record: 23–30
- Earned run average: 3.45
- Strikeouts: 442
- Stats at Baseball Reference

Teams
- As player: San Diego Padres (2005); Boston Red Sox (2006); Cleveland Indians (2008); Minnesota Twins (2008–2009); Oakland Athletics (2009–2011); Arizona Diamondbacks (2012); Boston Red Sox (2012–2015); Miami Marlins (2016); Minnesota Twins (2017); Cleveland Indians (2017); As executive: Chicago Cubs (2019–2023); Boston Red Sox (2024–present)

Career highlights and awards
- World Series champion (2013)

Craig Andrew Breslow (/ˈbrɛzloʊ/; born August 8, 1980) is an American baseball executive and former professional baseball pitcher. He is currently the president of baseball operations of the Boston Red Sox. Breslow pitched for 12 seasons in Major League Baseball (MLB) for the San Diego Padres, Boston Red Sox, Cleveland Indians, Minnesota Twins, Oakland Athletics, Arizona Diamondbacks, and Miami Marlins. He also pitched for Team Israel at the 2017 World Baseball Classic.

Breslow was selected in the 26th round of the 2002 MLB draft by the Milwaukee Brewers, and debuted in MLB with the Padres in 2005. With the Red Sox, he won the World Series in 2013. He made his final MLB appearance during the 2017 season. As of the end of the 2018 season, he ranked fourth among all active left-handed MLB pitchers in career appearances.

As a senior at Yale University, where he majored in molecular biophysics and biochemistry, Breslow led the Ivy League with a 2.56 earned run average. During his MLB career, he was called the "smartest man in baseball" by reporters at the Minneapolis Star Tribune and The Wall Street Journal. In 2010, the Sporting News named him the smartest athlete on their top 20 list.

== Early life ==
Breslow was born in New Haven, Connecticut, and raised in Trumbull, Connecticut. He is Jewish, and attended Hebrew school. His family attended Congregation B'nai Israel in Bridgeport, Connecticut, where he had his bar mitzvah in 1993. He has fasted while pitching on Yom Kippur, and noted: "Being Jewish is more difficult in baseball ... but I try to do what I can in terms of paying attention to holidays."

Breslow's father Abe Breslow, an All-American soccer player in college, is a teacher and the former department chair in Physical Education and Health, and boys tennis coach and girls soccer coach, at Trumbull High School. His mother, Ann Breslow, is a math teacher in Bridgeport.

In 1992, when Breslow was 12 years old, his sister Lesley—two years older—was diagnosed with pediatric thyroid cancer, for which she had surgery to remove all of her thyroid gland (a thyroidectomy). "Something as traumatic as that has a lasting impact," Breslow said. "It confirmed my interest [in medicine]. Being a doctor went from being a prestigious profession to something that changes people's lives." The experience led Breslow to take an interest in molecular biophysics and biochemistry. Later in life, Breslow formed a non-profit foundation to help children with cancer.

During his playing career, he was listed at 6 feet 1 inch (1.85 m) and 185 pounds (84 kg). In 2014, he was inducted into the Fairfield County, Connecticut Sports Hall of Fame.

=== High school ===
Breslow attended Trumbull High School in Trumbull, Connecticut, graduating in 1998. He was a standout in baseball and soccer, and served as team captain in both sports during his senior year.

In baseball, he was the winning pitcher in the Class LL State Baseball championship game, playing with teammate and future Arizona Diamondbacks second round draft pick and major league infielder, Jamie D'Antona. He also played in little league with future major league pitcher Charlie Morton. As a senior in high school, Breslow played in the Connecticut/Massachusetts All-Star game at Fenway Park. He was named to the 1998 New Haven Register All-Area team.

In soccer, he helped lead Trumbull High to their first-ever state tournament victory. In 1997, he was named to the Fairfield County Interscholastic Athletic Conference Boys First-Team Soccer Team. He was known for having an uncanny ability to score from very difficult and wide angles, and ranks among the school's all-time scorers. Scholastically he excelled as well, scoring 1420 on his SAT.

=== College ===
Breslow graduated from Yale University in 2002 with a degree in molecular biophysics and biochemistry, and gained admission to the NYU School of Medicine, which he deferred.

Breslow was captain of the Yale Bulldogs baseball team in the Ivy League. As a freshman in 1999, he pitched for the Middletown Giants of the New England Collegiate Baseball League; in November 2013 he was inducted into the NECBL's Hall of Fame. As a junior, he led Yale with three victories and led the Ivy League with a 2.61 earned run average (ERA), striking out 66 batters in 51 2/3 innings (ranking 13th in the nation in strikeouts per nine innings). He earned All-Ivy honors that season, which included a 16-strikeout performance vs. Cornell, and a one-hit shutout at Harvard. As a senior, he led the Ivy League with a 2.56 ERA.

In 2002, Breslow was named a Jewish Sports Review College Baseball First Team All-American, along with future major leaguers Sam Fuld and Adam Greenberg.

Breslow was drafted in the 26th round (769th overall) of the 2002 Major League Baseball draft by the Milwaukee Brewers. Breslow deferred acceptance to the New York University School of Medicine because of his "love of the game". As of July 2017, he had deferred his acceptance to the medical school four times, as he continued to play baseball.

Breslow reached the major leagues in 2005, the first Yale graduate to do so since Ron Darling (1983–95). He pitched his first game for San Diego on July 23, 2005. Breslow was also one of six Ivy Leaguers on major league rosters at the beginning of the 2009 season. In 2012, Breslow and catcher Ryan Lavarnway became the first Yale grads to be Major League teammates since 1949, and the first All-Yale battery in the major leagues since 1883.

== Professional career ==
=== Milwaukee Brewers organization (2002–2004) ===
In 2002, Breslow ranked fifth in the Pioneer League with six wins, going 6–2 with a 1.82 ERA in 23 appearances out of the pen for the Rookie-level Ogden Raptors. He struck out 56 in 54 1/3 innings, and limited the opposition to a .218 average. In 2003, he averaged 11 1/3 strikeouts per nine innings for the Single-A Beloit Snappers of the Midwest League, fanning 80 batters in 65 innings.

In 2004, Breslow made 23 relief appearances with the Single-A High Desert Mavericks of the California League, going 1–3 with a 7.19 ERA. The Brewers released Breslow during the 2004 season.

After his release, Breslow took the Medical College Admission Test (MCAT) and scored a 34 (the average score for medical school applicants was 28), and applied to NYU Medical School. Though the medical school accepted him, they would only let him start if he agreed to stop playing baseball. "I wasn't ready to give it up", he said. "I thought I could still get guys out." In 2013, he was undecided as to whether after his baseball career ended, he would attend medical school or alternatively become involved in the operational side of baseball.

=== Northeast League (2004) ===
Breslow completed the 2004 season pitching for the New Jersey Jackals of the Northeast League, an independent baseball league. He held batters to a .204 average and recorded 37 strikeouts in 26 1/3 innings, an average of 12.6 strikeouts per nine innings.

=== San Diego Padres organization (2005) ===
Signed by the San Diego Padres in 2005 for $1 out of a tryout camp, Breslow excelled, getting $1,500 after making the Double-A Southern League Mobile BayBears, allowing a .212 average in 52 innings over 40 outings while striking out 47 and walking 17 with a 2.75 ERA. He earned his first big league callup on July 23, 2005. He was mistaken for the team batboy during his first day with the Padres. Breslow became the 24th Yalie to play in Major League Baseball and the first to reach the major leagues since Ron Darling. "It wasn't until I was playing baseball in the big leagues that I thought I could play baseball in the big leagues", he said.

Breslow then split the rest of the season between San Diego and the Triple-A Portland Beavers of the Pacific Coast League. In 14 relief appearances with San Diego, Breslow posted a 2.20 ERA without recording a decision. The Padres non-tendered Breslow on December 21, 2005.

=== Boston Red Sox organization (2006–2007) ===
==== 2006 ====
Breslow signed a minor league contract with the Boston Red Sox on February 1, 2006.

In 2006, Breslow was named an International League (Triple-A) All-Star while with the Pawtucket Red Sox. In 67 innings of work for the season, he was 7–1 with a 2.69 ERA and struck out an average of 10.3 batters per nine innings. He was selected by his teammates as the PawSox Most Valuable Pitcher. He was promoted to Boston in the second half of the season. In 13 relief appearances with the Red Sox in 2006, Breslow went 0–2 and posted a 3.75 ERA with 12 strikeouts in 12 innings pitched. He played in one game for the AA Portland Sea Dogs in 2013.

Off the field, he helped Red Sox pitcher Josh Beckett win a bet against catcher Doug Mirabelli. Breslow calculated how many times a baseball spins when it's thrown 90 miles an hour from the pitcher's mound to home plate. "Josh wanted to know if I could figure out how many times a baseball spins on the way to the plate", Breslow said. "There's a lot of variables, but I put in some figures and came up with answers for a fastball, curve, or slider. It's rather simple once you do it."

==== 2007 ====
Breslow earned a trip to the Triple-A All-Star game in July for the second straight season for the Pawtucket Red Sox. At the end of June, Breslow's ERA was 1.55. He struggled to end the season, finishing 2–3 with a 4.06 ERA, 25 walks, 73 strikeouts in 49 relief appearances. He was promoted to Boston on September 1, 2007, but did not make an appearance and was sent back to Pawtucket on September 2 to make room on the team roster for Jon Lester. Breslow was added to the postseason roster, and has a ring from winning the 2007 World Series — without pitching a game in the majors that year.

=== Cleveland Indians (2008) ===
On March 23, 2008, Breslow was claimed off outright waivers by the Cleveland Indians and was added to the 40-man roster. Breslow was out of minor league options, so the Indians had to keep him on their big league club out of camp, or expose him to waivers again. Breslow won the final spot on the Indians' Opening Day roster. "He's strong", Cleveland manager Eric Wedge said. "I want to be able to use him two innings. He's done that—if you look at his innings pitched the last couple of years versus appearances."

On May 23, after pitching in seven games and recording a 3.24 ERA, Breslow was designated for assignment.

=== Minnesota Twins (2008–2009) ===
2008

"He's not a guy who blows you away on the radar gun. He's not a big, imposing guy. But he gets people out. He knows how to pitch and when to throw what. He figures out ways to get guys out."

— Twins' assistant general manager Rob Antony

On May 29, 2008, the Minnesota Twins claimed Breslow off waivers. In 42 games for the Twins, Breslow went 0–2 with a 1.63 ERA, and gave up only 24 hits in 38 2/3 innings. Lefties hit .183 against him, with a .232 slugging percentage, and in save situations batters batted .100 against him, with a .100 slugging percentage. He did not give up a run in his last 14 appearances.

Breslow's aggregate 2008 ERA of 1.91 in 47 innings was ninth-best in the American League of all pitchers with at least 40 innings pitched, and second-best among AL lefty relievers. He held all batters to a .191 batting average, a .265 on-base percentage, and a .299 slugging percentage.

2009

Playing for the Twins in 2009, Breslow held left-handers to a .211 batting average and right-handers to a .226 batting average, but battled control problems in 17 appearances.

The Twins figured they had a 50–50 chance of losing Breslow when they placed him on waivers in May 2009 to clear space on their 25-man roster for fellow left-hander Sean Henn. Oakland needed bullpen help and claimed Breslow before his 72-hour waiver period expired. Had he cleared, the Twins could have sent him to Triple-A Rochester. "We were hoping to keep him", said assistant general manager Rob Antony. "We lost a bullpen guy without trying to lose a bullpen guy", manager Ron Gardenhire said. "I kind of got shocked when they told me."

=== Oakland Athletics (2009–2011) ===
==== 2009 ====
Searching for an experienced left-hander for their bullpen, the Oakland Athletics claimed Breslow off waivers on May 20, 2009. According to assistant general manager David Forst, the A's had tried to acquire him on other occasions. "I'm excited about taking a look at him", A's Manager Bob Geren said. "He's a left-handed guy that's experienced. He's had some success at this level." He was the A's key lefty out of the bullpen for the remainder of the season.

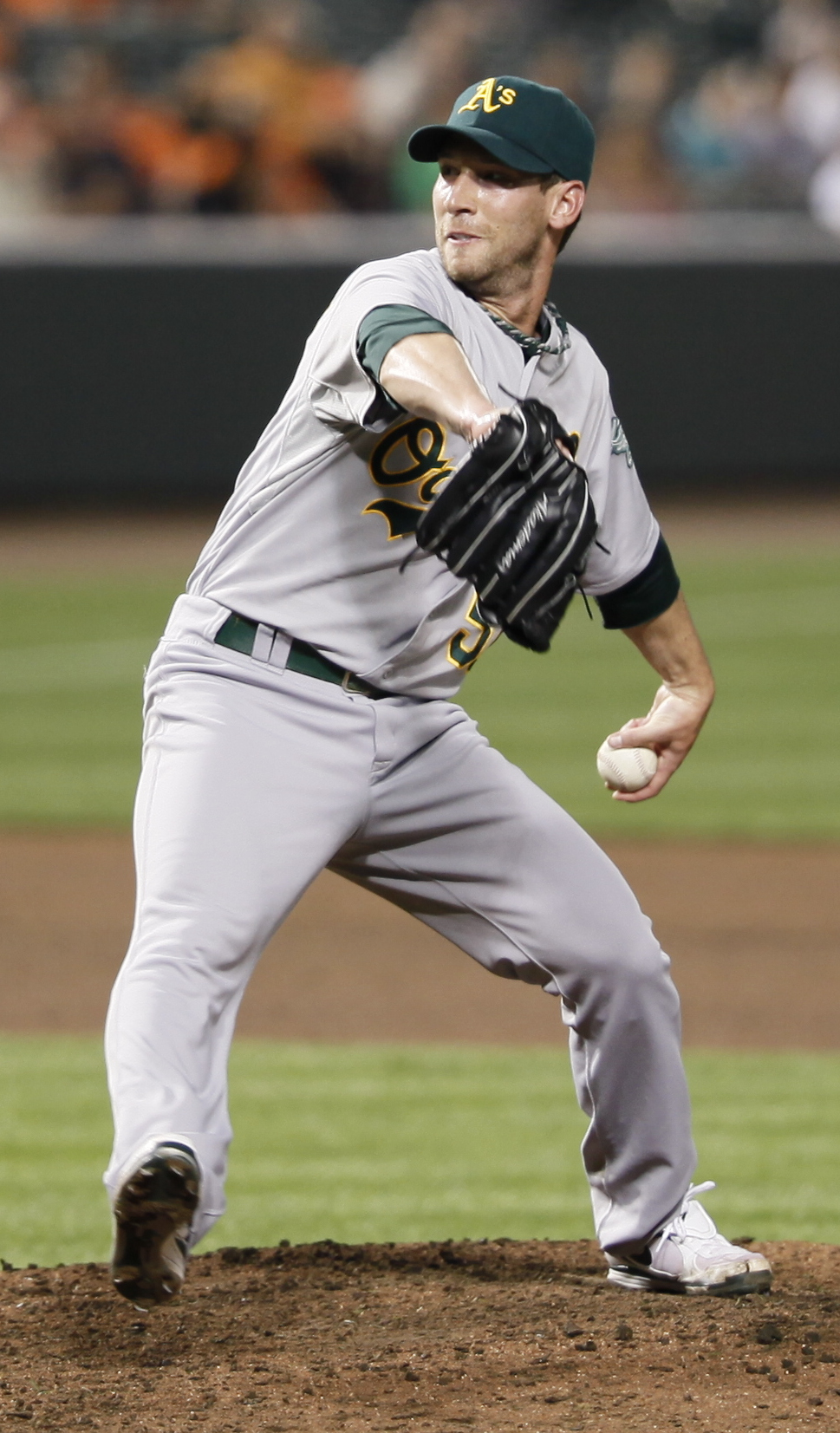
Craig Breslow with the Oakland Athletics in 2011.

Breslow was second in the AL in appearances in 2009, with 77. Batters hit only .143 against him when there were runners in scoring position. He held all batters to a .197 batting average, and a .289 on-base percentage.

He also continued to impress teammates with his intellect. "Breslow knows everything", A's left-hander Dallas Braden said. "I seriously want to be Craig Breslow when I grow up."

==== 2010 ====
Asked in 2010 whether there was a story behind his jersey number (#32), Breslow said: "When you spend time with many organizations over 5.5 years, you don't really care what number you get."

He was second in the AL in appearances in 2010 for the second year in a row, appearing in 75 games (the fifth-highest single-season total in A's history). Only seven of 33 inherited runners (21.2%) scored against him, third-best in the AL. He held batters to a .194 batting average, and a .272 on-base percentage. Opposing batters were 0-for-11 with zero RBIs against him with the bases loaded, which were the most bases-loaded at bats against an AL pitcher with zero RBIs since the stat was tracked beginning in 1974.

His 71 strikeouts were the most by a lefty reliever in Oakland history, breaking the mark of 69 set by Bob Lacey in 1977. He finished with a career-high 74 2/3 innings; fourth among American League relievers. He was named the 2010 Most Valuable Jewish Pitcher by Jewish Major Leaguers, as Ryan Braun won hitter honors. Through 2010, he had in his career allowed only 33 of 151 (21.9%) of inherited runners to score, which was the fourth-best percentage among pitchers with 150 or more inherited runners since the statistic was first tracked in 1974. Of his eight career MLB saves, five came during the 2010 season.

==== 2011 ====
In 2011, Breslow was 0–2 with a 3.79 ERA in 67 games, in which he pitched 59 1/3 innings. He led all relief pitchers with five pickoffs, and led American League relievers with seven caught stealing.

=== Arizona Diamondbacks (2012) ===
On December 9, 2011, Breslow and Trevor Cahill were traded to the Arizona Diamondbacks for Ryan Cook, Jarrod Parker, and Collin Cowgill. Since Breslow was the last arbitration-eligible player for Arizona to be under contract, he avoided arbitration and a deal was made at $1.795 million. His salary was a $395,000 increase over the 2011 season.

In 40 games and 43 1/3 innings in 2013 for Arizona before being traded, Breslow had a 2–0 record and a 2.70 ERA with 42 strikeouts, and limited opposing batters to a .233 batting average. As of the end of the 2017 season, he was the player with the most innings pitched for Arizona without ever losing. He was one of only two pitchers with a 1.000 winning percentage with Arizona who had more than one victory, with the other being Jimmie Sherfy.

=== Boston Red Sox (2012–2015) ===
==== 2012 ====
On July 31, 2012, Breslow was traded to the Boston Red Sox for outfielder Scott Podsednik and relief pitcher Matt Albers. In 23 relief appearances with Boston, he was 1–0 with a 2.70 ERA and 19 strikeouts. He held opponents to a .206 batting average, and opposing lefties to a .184 batting average.

For the season, Breslow was 3–0 with a 2.70 ERA in 63 games for Arizona and Boston, and held left-handed hitters to a .222 batting average.

==== 2013 ====
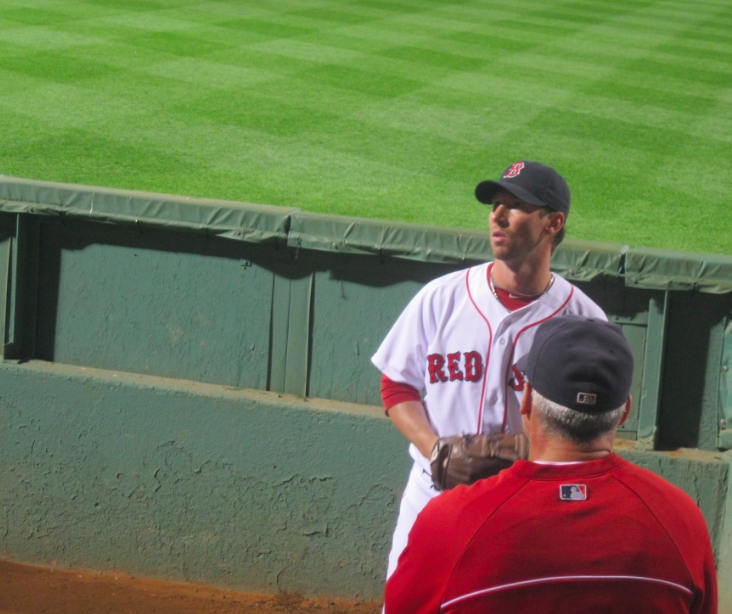
Breslow warming up in the bullpen during the 2013 season

In January 2013, Breslow signed a two-year contract with the Red Sox for at least $6.25 million. He received $2.325 million in 2013, and $3.825 million in 2014. The Red Sox had a $4 million option for 2015, with a $100,000 buyout. Breslow began the 2013 season on the disabled list with left shoulder tendinitis. After rehab outings with Double A Portland and Triple A Pawtucket, he was activated on May 7. He emerged as the Red Sox' primary set-up reliever. On September 16, Breslow was named the Red Sox nominee for the 2013 Roberto Clemente Award.

In the 2013 regular season, Breslow was 5–2 with a 1.81 ERA (third among left-handed relievers in the American League) in 61 games and 59 2/3 innings, and held opposing batters to a .228 batting average. His 0.65 ERA the second half of the season was fourth-best among major league relievers with at least 25 innings thrown. In his last 28 appearances of the regular season, he allowed only one run.

In the 2013 American League Division Series, Breslow pitched 3 2/3 scoreless innings over three games, notching a win and allowing two hits and one walk while striking out four, as the Red Sox defeated Tampa Bay. In the 2013 American League Championship Series, he added 3 1/3 scoreless innings against the Detroit Tigers, bringing his post-season total to seven scoreless innings in seven appearances, in which he held the opposition to a .130 batting average. Breslow wrote a blog during the 2013 post-season. During the 2013 playoffs, he pitched in 10 of 16 games, garnering a 2.45 ERA.

From 2008 to 2013, Breslow pitched in more games (392) than any other left-handed reliever other than Matt Thornton, with a 2.82 ERA, while limiting batters to a .224 batting average.

==== 2014 ====
Breslow began the 2014 season on the disabled list, not making his first appearance until the season's 10th game, and compiled a 5.96 ERA in 60 appearances for the Red Sox. His performance contrasted sharply with his 2.82 ERA over the prior six seasons. Breslow did save one game in the 2014 season on August 25, 2014, during an extra inning victory over American League East rival Toronto.

The Red Sox declined his $4 million option, buying him out for $100,000 and making him a free agent. The Red Sox were still in a position to re-sign Breslow for less money. General manager Ben Cherington said: "He has a lot of good qualities and we have a great relationship with him, so we'll see what happens."

On September 16, Breslow was named the Red Sox nominee for the 2014 Roberto Clemente Award.

On December 19, the Red Sox re-signed Breslow to a one-year, $2 million contract.

==== 2015 ====
During the 2015 season, Breslow was 0–4 with one save and a 4.15 ERA for Boston in 45 relief appearances, striking out 46 and walking 23 in 65 innings. He became a free agent following the season.

=== Miami Marlins (2016) ===
On February 12, 2016, Breslow signed a minor-league contract with the Miami Marlins. He was designated for assignment on May 11, he cleared waivers and was sent outright to Triple-A New Orleans Zephyrs two days later. After going 0–2 with a 4.50 ERA in 15 relief appearances, he was released on July 18, 2016, at his request.

=== Texas Rangers organization (2016) ===
On July 24, 2016, Breslow signed a minor league contract with an opt-out clause with the Texas Rangers. The Rangers released him on August 7, 2016.

=== Minnesota Twins second stint (2017) ===
On February 8, 2017, Breslow signed a minor league contract offered by the Minnesota Twins, which he chose over nearly a dozen competing offers—some for more money. He was added to the team's 40-man roster on March 20, and made the team's opening day roster at the end of the month. He earned $1.25 million in salary, and was eligible for $1 million more possible in incentives. His contract called for him to earn bonuses of $150,000 at each of seven different appearance levels: 40, 45, 50, 55, 60, 65, and 70 games. He was designated for assignment on July 24, 2017, after appearing in 30 games and going 1–1 with a 5.23 ERA. He was released a week later.

=== Cleveland Indians second stint (2017) ===
On August 4, 2017, Breslow signed a minor league contract with the Cleveland Indians and assigned him to the Class AAA Columbus Clippers. where he had an 0–0 record with a 3.86 ERA in seven relief appearances. He was called up to the Indians on August 26, and had an 0–0 record with a 4.15 ERA in seven relief appearances. He held left-handed-hitters to a line of .196/.294/.286 over the course of the 2017 season. On November 2, he elected to become a free agent.

=== Toronto Blue Jays organization (2018) ===
On February 12, 2018, Breslow agreed to a minor league contract with the Toronto Blue Jays that included an invitation to spring training. He was released on March 24 in a procedural move, and was re-signed days later to a new contract. On April 2, Breslow agreed to go to the Double-A New Hampshire Fisher Cats in the Eastern League to continue working on his new sidearm delivery. Overall, he pitched 28.1 innings and was 1–1 with one save and a 5.40 ERA in 33 relief appearances for the Fisher Cats, the Triple-A Buffalo Bisons in the International League, and the GCL Blue Jays in the Rookie Gulf Coast League.

After the 2018 season, Breslow ranked fourth out of all active left-handed MLB pitchers in career appearances, with 576. On November 2, 2018, he elected free agency.

=== Pitching detail ===
Breslow's four-seam fastball ranged at 89 to 92 mph (143 to 148 km/h); he threw it 42% of the time, and batters hit .228 against it with a .366 slugging percentage. He added an 86 mph (138 km/h) cut fastball and a 90 mph (140 km/h) sinker. He also had a plus overhand curveball at 70 to 77 mph (113 to 124 km/h), an average to above-average 78 mph (126 km/h) changeup, and a 77 mph (124 km/h) slider/slurve. During the 2016 offseason, Breslow dropped his arm slot and added a two-seam fastball. His ability to mix up his pitches was what made him very effective.

During the 2016 offseason, Breslow began experimenting with the Rapsodo Baseball system to analyze his mechanics and spin rate on his pitches. His hope was to improve the movement on his pitches and revive his career. When he began using the system in October 2016, Breslow had 9.45 inches (24.0 cm) of horizontal break on his two-seamer. By January 2017, he was able to improve and add nearly 9 inches (23 cm) of additional movement on the two-seamer, resulting in a horizontal break of 18.35 inches (46.6 cm). Vertical movement on the pitch also increased by about 6 inches (15 cm).

== Team Israel ==
Breslow pitched for Israel at the 2017 World Baseball Classic during the qualifying round in September 2016. During the opening game of the tournament, Breslow was credited with the win after throwing 26 pitches over one inning, giving up two hits and a walk while recording two strikeouts. Breslow again appeared in the final game of the series, throwing only two pitches while getting one out.

In February 2017, it was announced that Breslow would be on the roster for Israel at the 2017 World Baseball Classic main tournament. He pulled out of being on the team in round one after the Twins offered him an invite to spring training, and was placed in Team Israel's designated pitcher pool, meaning he could be added in later rounds even though he did not play for the team in rounds one or two.

== Post-playing career ==
=== Chicago Cubs ===
In January 2019, the Chicago Cubs hired Breslow as their Director of Strategic Initiatives for Baseball Operations, joining Theo Epstein in the team's front office. In that position, he was to "help to evaluate and implement data-based processes throughout all facets of Baseball Operations" and "support the organization's pitching infrastructure in Player Development and the major leagues."

On October 17, 2019, the Cubs promoted Breslow to the position of Director of Pitching / Special Assistant to the President and General Manager. His role focused on the strategic management of the club's minor league pitching infrastructure to more homegrown impact pitchers.

In November 2020, the Cubs promoted Breslow to the position of Assistant General Manager/Vice President, Pitching.

=== Boston Red Sox ===
On October 25, 2023, the Boston Red Sox hired Breslow as their chief baseball officer, replacing Chaim Bloom. Breslow became the team's lead decision-maker on players, coaches, and personnel. In his first season with the team, the 2024 Red Sox finished third in the American League East with an 81–81 record. The 2025 Red Sox improved to 89–73, clinching a playoff berth for the first time since 2021, before losing in the Wild Card Series to the New York Yankees. The 2026 Red Sox again qualified for the postseason, and again lost in the Wild Card Series to the Yankees. During the 2026–27 offseason, Breslow's title with the Red Sox was changed to president of baseball operations.

== Awards ==
- 2010 MLB Roberto Clemente Award Nominee
- 2010 Oakland Athletics Dave Stewart Community Service Award Recipient
- 2010 Finalist for the Hutch Award
- 2014 Distinguished Service Award from the Brotherhood of Congregation Mishkan Tefila, Chestnut Hill, Massachusetts

== Personal life ==
Breslow invested $50,000 in a Boston-based startup company that designs bicycle-friendly business apparel called Ministry of Supply. The investment came after his then-fiancée, Kelly Shaffer, bought him a shirt as a birthday present, Breslow took the shirt on the road and was so pleased with the performance he then bought two more shirts and a pair of pants. Then he decided to make the investment in the company.

Breslow and Shaffer married on November 9, 2013—ten days after he'd won the World Series with Boston. They have twin boys, Carter and Mason, born in June 2015, and daughter Livia, born December 2018. They live in Newton, Massachusetts.

=== Intelligence ===
Breslow was nicknamed the "smartest man in baseball" by Minneapolis Star Tribune Twins beat writer La Velle E. Neal III, and The Wall Street Journal reporter Jason Turbow wrote: "Judging by his résumé, Craig Breslow is the smartest man in baseball, if not the entire world." In 2010 the Sporting News named him the smartest athlete on their top-20 list. In 2012, Men's Fitness named him one of the Top 10 Smartest Athletes in Professional Sports.

Referring to the reactions he has experienced to the plaudits, Breslow said: "There's no end to the teasing I've taken". Red Sox manager John Farrell observed in 2013: "Breslow uses words in a normal conversation that I'm not used to."

As to the impact of his intelligence on his baseball performance, Breslow admits that he analyzes video and looks for inefficiencies in the "kinematic system" of his delivery. At the same time, he often subscribes to the "keep it simple, stupid" principle.

=== In media ===
Breslow's collegiate career and his first year with the Brewers organization are partially discussed in the book Odd Man Out: A Year on the Mound with a Minor League Misfit by Matt McCarthy. McCarthy and Breslow were friends and teammates at Yale, and were on rival Pioneer League teams during the 2002 season. He also starred in a parody of Rex Ryan's foot fetish video called "ihaveprettylefthand".

=== Philanthropy ===
In 2008, Breslow started the Strike 3 Foundation, a non-profit charity that funds pediatric cancer research.

The organization has teamed up with the Yale-New Haven Children's Hospital, Connecticut Children's Medical Center, Conquer Cancer Foundation of the American Society of Clinical Oncology, and Children's Hospital of Philadelphia. The foundation donated $500,000 to the Yale-New Haven Children's Hospital to help enhance their Pediatric Bone Marrow Transplant Program. It has also made gifts to CureSearch for Children's Cancer, Connecticut Children's Medical Center, Yale's Smilow Cancer Hospital, and others.

Breslow hopes to hold annual events in Connecticut and during spring training. His first benefit raised $100,000, and his second benefit more than $85,000. The charity has raised more than $3 million.

== See also ==
- List of Jewish Major League Baseball players
