= ABCA4 =

Mammalian protein found in humans

Identifiers
- Aliases: ABCA4, AW050280, Abc10, Abcr, D430003I15Rik, RmP, ARMD2, CORD3, FFM, RP19, STGD, STGD1, ATP binding cassette subfamily A member 4
- External IDs: OMIM: 601691; MGI: 109424; GeneCards: ABCA4
Enzyme activity
EC #	BRENDA	ExPASy	KEGG	MetaCyc
7.6.2.1	↗	↗	↗	↗

Gene location (Human)
Chr.	Chromosome 1 (human)
Band	1p22.1	Start	93,992,834 bp
Band	1p22.1	End	94,121,148 bp

Gene location (Mouse)
Chr.	Chromosome 3 (mouse)
Band	3 G1|3 52.94 cM	Start	121,838,092 bp
Band	3 G1|3 52.94 cM	End	121,973,772 bp
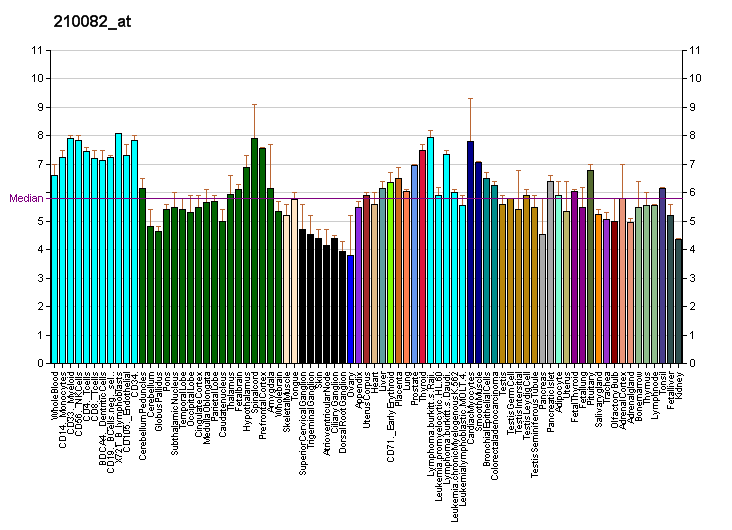
RNA expression pattern
Bgee	Human / Mouse (ortholog); Top expressed in: retinal pigment epithelium; gonad; testicle; right uterine tube; Epithelium of choroid plexus; tail of epididymis; corpus epididymis; right lobe of liver; skin of abdomen; jejunal mucosa / Top expressed in: neural layer of retina; choroid plexus of fourth ventricle; Epithelium of choroid plexus; retinal pigment epithelium; epithelium of lens; ciliary body; iris; pineal gland; corneal stroma; tail of embryo; More reference expression data
BioGPS	More reference expression data
Gene ontology
Molecular function	ATPase-coupled transmembrane transporter activity; nucleotide binding; phospholipid transporter activity; ATPase-coupled intramembrane lipid transporter activity; ATP binding; phosphatidylethanolamine flippase activity; ATPase activity; transporter activity; lipid transporter activity
Cellular component	integral component of membrane; intracellular membrane-bounded organelle; membrane; photoreceptor outer segment; integral component of plasma membrane; photoreceptor disc membrane; endoplasmic reticulum
Biological process	response to stimulus; phospholipid transfer to membrane; retinoid metabolic process; phototransduction of visible light; photoreceptor cell maintenance; visual perception; phospholipid translocation; lipid transport; transmembrane transport
Sources:Amigo / QuickGO
Orthologs
Databases	NCBI: entry; OMA: entry
Species	Human	Mouse
Entrez	24	11304
Ensembl	ENSG00000198691	ENSMUSG00000028125
UniProt	P78363	O35600
RefSeq (mRNA)	NM_000350	NM_007378
RefSeq (protein)	NP_000341	NP_031404
Location (UCSC)	Chr 1: 93.99 – 94.12 Mb	Chr 3: 121.84 – 121.97 Mb
PubMed search
- Wikidata
View/Edit Human	View/Edit Mouse

ATP-binding cassette, sub-family A (ABC1), member 4, also known as ABCA4 or ABCR, is a protein which in humans is encoded by the ABCA4 gene.

ABCA4 is a member of the ATP-binding cassette transporter gene sub-family A (ABC1) found exclusively in multicellular eukaryotes. The gene was first cloned and characterized in 1997 as a gene that causes Stargardt disease, an autosomal recessive disease that causes macular degeneration. The ABCA4 gene transcribes a large retina-specific protein with two transmembrane domains (TMD), two glycosylated extracellular domains (ECD), and two nucleotide-binding domains (NBD). The ABCA4 protein is almost exclusively expressed in retina localizing in outer segment disk edges of rod photoreceptors.

== Structure ==
Previously known as the photoreceptor rim protein RmP or ABCR, the recently proposed ABCA4 structure consists of two transmembrane domains (TMDs), two large glycosylated extracytosolic domains (ECD), and two internal nucleotide binding domains (NBDs). One TMD spans across membranes with six units of protein linked together to form a domain. The TMDs are usually not conserved across genomes due to its specificity and diversity in function as channels or ligand-binding controllers. However, NBDs are highly conserved across different genomes—an observation consistent with which it binds and hydrolyzes ATP. NBD binds adenosine triphosphate molecules (ATP) to utilize the high-energy inorganic phosphate to carry out change in conformation of the ABC transporter. Transcribed ABCA4 forms into a heterodimer: the two dimerized compartments of the channel are different from each other. When TMDs are situated in a membrane, they form a barrel-like structure permeable to retinoid ligands and control channel access to its binding sites. Once an ATP is hydrolized at the NBDs of the channel, NBDs are brought together to tilt and modify TMDs to modulate ligand binding to the channel. A recently proposed model of retinoid transfer occurring as a result of alternating exposure of external and internal TMD ligand binding sites, all controlled by binding of ATP, is based on recent structural analyses of bacterial ABC transporters.

== Function ==
ABCR is localized to outer segment disk edges of rods and cones. ABCR is expressed much less than rhodopsin, approximately at 1:120. Comparisons between mammalian ABCA4 to other ABCs, cellular localization of ABCA4, and analyses of ABCA4 knockout mice suggest that ABCA4 may function as an inward-directed retinoid flippase. Flippase is a transmembrane protein that "flips" its conformation to transport materials across a membrane. In the case of ABCA4, the flippase facilitates transfer of N-retinyl-phosphatidylethanolamine (NR-PE), a covalent adduct of all-trans retinaldehyde (ATR) with phosphatidylethanolamine (PE), trapped inside the disk as charged species out to the cytoplasmic surface. Once transported, ATR is reduced to vitamin A and then transferred to retinal pigment epithelium to be recycled into 11-cis-retinal. This alternating access-release model for ABCA4 has four steps: (1) binding of ATP to an NBD to bring two NBDs together and expose outer vestibule high affinity binding site located in TMD, (2) binding of NR-PE/ATR on extracellular side of the channel, (3) ATP hydrolysis promoting gate opening and movement of NR-PE/ATR across the membrane to the low-affinity binding site on the intracellular portion of TMD, and (4) release of adenosine diphosphate (ADP) and inorganic phosphate (P_{i}) to release the bound ligand. The channel is then ready to transfer another molecule of NR-PE/ATR again.

N-retinylidene-N-retinyl-ethanolamine (A2E)

The ABCR -/- knockout mouse has delayed dark adaptation but normal final rod threshold relative to controls. This suggests bulk transmembrane diffusion pathways that remove ATR/NR-PE from extracellular membranes. After bleaching the retina with strong light, ATR/NR-PE accumulates significantly in outer segments. This accumulation leads to formation of toxic cationic bis-pyridinium salt, N-retinylidene-N-retinyl-ethanolamine (A2E), which causes human dry and wet age-related macular degeneration. From this experiment, it was concluded that ABCR has a significant role in clearing accumulation of ATR/NR-PE to prevent formation of A2E in extracellular photoreceptor surfaces during bleach recovery.

== Clinical significance ==
Mutations in ABCA4 gene are known to cause the autosomal-recessive disease Stargardt macular dystrophy (STGD), which is a hereditary juvenile macular degeneration disease causing progressive loss of photoreceptor cells. STGD is characterized by reduced visual acuity and color vision, loss of central (macular) vision, delayed dark adaptation, and accumulation of autofluorescent RPE lipofuscin. Removal of NR-PE/ATR appears to be significant in normal bleach recovery and to mitigate persistent opsin signaling that causes photoreceptors to degenerate. ABCA4 also mitigates long-term effects of accumulation of ATR that results in irreversible ATR binding to a second molecule of ATR and NR-PE to form dihydro-N-retinylidene-N-retinyl-phosphatidyl-ethanolamine (A2PE-H2). A2PE-H2 traps ATR and accumulates in outer segments to further oxidize into N-retinylidene-N-retinyl-phosphatidyl-ethanolamine (A2PE). After diurnal disk-shedding and phagocytosis of outer segment by RPE cells, A2PE is hydrolyzed inside the RPE phagolysosome to form A2E. Accumulation of A2E causes toxicity at the primary RPE level and secondary photoreceptor destruction in macular degenerations.

Additional diseases that may link to mutations in ABCA4 include fundus flavimaculatus, cone-rod dystrophy, retinitis pigmentosa, and age-related macular degeneration.

The GENEVA Cleft Consortium study first identified ABCA4 as being associated with cleft lip and/or cleft palate with multiple markers giving evidence of linkage and association at the genome-wide significance level. Although SNPs in this gene are associated with cleft lip/palate there is no functional or expression data to support it as the causal gene which may, instead, lie in a region adjacent to ABCA4. A combination of genome wide association, rare coding sequence variants, craniofacial specific expression, and interactions with IRF6 support a role for the adjacent ARHGAP29 gene to be the likely causal gene playing a role in nonsyndromic cleft lip and/or palate.

== See also ==
- ATP-binding cassette transporter
