= ARHGAP29 =

Protein-coding gene in humans

Identifiers
- Aliases: ARHGAP29, PARG1, Rho GTPase activating protein 29
- External IDs: OMIM: 610496; MGI: 2443818; GeneCards: ARHGAP29

Gene location (Human)
Chr.	Chromosome 1 (human)
Band	1p22.1	Start	94,148,988 bp
Band	1p22.1	End	94,275,068 bp

Gene location (Mouse)
Chr.	Chromosome 3 (mouse)
Band	3|3 G1	Start	121,746,190 bp
Band	3|3 G1	End	121,810,402 bp
RNA expression pattern
Bgee	Human / Mouse (ortholog); Top expressed in: visceral pleura; parietal pleura; renal medulla; glomerulus; metanephric glomerulus; skin of hip; parotid gland; vena cava; Achilles tendon; skin of thigh / Top expressed in: cumulus cell; ovary; left lung lobe; renal corpuscle; otolith organ; utricle; hand; atrium; right lung; right lung lobe; More reference expression data
BioGPS	n/a
Gene ontology
Molecular function	PDZ domain binding; metal ion binding; GTPase activator activity
Cellular component	cytosol; cytoplasm; protein-containing complex
Biological process	Rho protein signal transduction; signal transduction; regulation of small GTPase mediated signal transduction; intracellular signal transduction; positive regulation of GTPase activity
Sources:Amigo / QuickGO
Orthologs
Databases	NCBI: entry; OMA: entry
Species	Human	Mouse
Entrez	9411	214137
Ensembl	ENSG00000137962	ENSMUSG00000039831
UniProt	Q52LW3	Q8CGF1
RefSeq (mRNA)	NM_004815; NM_001328664; NM_001328665; NM_001328666; NM_001328667	NM_172525; NM_001356524
RefSeq (protein)	NP_001315593; NP_001315594; NP_001315595; NP_001315596; NP_004806	NP_766113; NP_001343453
Location (UCSC)	Chr 1: 94.15 – 94.28 Mb	Chr 3: 121.75 – 121.81 Mb
PubMed search
- Wikidata
View/Edit Human	View/Edit Mouse

ARHGAP29 is a gene located on chromosome 1p22 that encodes Rho GTPase activating protein (GAP) 29, a protein that mediates the cyclical regulation of small GTP binding proteins such as RhoA.

== Function ==
ARHGAP29 is expressed in the developing face and may act downstream of IRF6 in craniofacial development.

== Structure ==
ARHGAP29 contains four domains including a coiled-coil region known to interact with Rap2, a C1 domain, the Rho GTPase domain, and a small C-terminal region that interacts with PTPL1.

== Clinical significance ==
The 1p22 locus containing ARHGAP29 was associated with nonsyndromic cleft lip/palate by genome wide association and meta-analysis. A follow-up study identified rare coding variants including a nonsense and a frameshift variant in patients with nonsyndromic cleft lip/palate. The finding of ARHGAP29's role in craniofacial development was discovered after the adjacent ABCA4 gene lacked functional or expression data to support it as the etiologic gene for nonsyndromic cleft lip/palate even though SNPs in the ABCA4 gene were associated with cleft lip/palate.
