= Karl Stargardt =

German ophthalmologist (1875–1927)

- Born: Karl Stargardt; 4 December 1875
- Died: 2 April 1927 (aged 51)

Karl Bruno Stargardt (4 December 1875 Berlin – 2 April 1927) was a German ophthalmologist.

== Life ==
In 1899 he received his doctorate from the University of Kiel, where he later became chief physician at the university eye clinic. Afterwards he worked in the eye clinic at Strassburg, then becoming head of ophthalmology at Bonn. In 1923 he succeeded Alfred Bielschowsky (1871-1940) as chair of ophthalmology at the University of Marburg. Soon afterwards he developed nephritis and cardiac complications, and died on April 2, 1927.

His name is associated with Stargardt disease, an hereditary eye disease that is one of the most common causes of childhood macular degeneration.

== Written works ==
- Über Epithelzellveränderungen beim Trachom und andern Conjunctivalerkrankungen. (Concerning hereditary, progressive degeneration in the macular region of the eye); Albrecht von Graefe's Archiv für Ophthalmologie, 1909, 69, 525–542.
- Diagnostik der Farbensinnstörungen. (Diagnosis of color vision problems); Berlin, 1912.
- Über die Ursachen des Sehnervenschwundes bei der Tabes und der progressiven Paralyse. (About the causes of optic nerve atrophy in tabes and progressive paralysis); from Royal. Psychiatr. and Nerve Clinic in Kiel with medical advice by Prof. Dr. Ernst Siemerling
