= RallyPoint =

Network website for US military members

- Type: Private
- Industry: Professional Networking
- Founded: 2012
- Headquarters: Boston, Massachusetts
- Key people: David Gowel (CEO); Yinon Weiss (Co-Founder); Aaron Kletzing (Co-Founder)
- Website: www.RallyPoint.com (offline)

RallyPoint is a privately held American company founded in 2012 by military veterans at Harvard Business School. The company is a professional network serving the US military and its veterans, and has been called "LinkedIn for the military,". The community allows current military members and veterans to connect, explore career opportunities both inside and outside the military, and engage on topics important to the military.

The company evolved into a government contractor that supports research, outreach, and interventions to benefit the military, veteran, family, and caregiver community.

== History ==
The company's two co-founders, Yinon Weiss and Aaron Kletzing, first met in Iraq in a remote combat outpost northwest of Baghdad in 2008. Several years later, the two ran into each other again as students this time at Harvard Business School.

RallyPoint was launched out of the Harvard Innovation Lab at the Harvard Business School, and is currently headquartered in Harvard, Massachusetts.

In April 2012, RallyPoint won $10,000 for placing as runner-up in the Harvard Business School Business Plan Competition and on October 23, 2012, RallyPoint won $100,000 from MassChallenge after competing against over 1,300 other ventures. The company raised private funding after both of these events.

In 2016, Army Veteran, David Gowel (author of The Power in a Link) became the company's CEO and a member of the board of directors.

In November 2016, RallyPoint was named one of the top 5 Veteran-Founded Startups in America in Forbes.

In 2020, RallyPoint announced a partnership with Amazon Web Services to address military and veteran suicide risk.

In 2023, The Department of Defense's (DOD's) Military OneSource Spouse Education & Career Opportunities program identified RallyPoint as an online network the military community can use to help create a positive experience when joining, serving, and transitioning out of military service to Veteran life. The DOD published a video explaining how military spouses can use RallyPoint to further their careers and quality of life.

In October 2023, Harvard University's psychology chair, Dr. Matthew Nock provided an interview to Federal News Network referring to his work with RallyPoint as a "promising new avenue to help prevent suicides among veterans."

In January 2024, Dr. Nock released research with collaborators from MIT and Amazon about Dr. Nock's work with RallyPoint utilizing machine learning to predict and intervene with suicide risk for the military community on RallyPoint's platform. This work was performed under a Small Business Innovation Research (SBIR) Direct to Phase II contract awarded by the U.S. Air Force AFWERX program with RallyPoint as the prime contractor.

In July 2024, Zeta Global (NYSE:ZETA) CEO, David A. Steinberg announced a partnership with RallyPoint to enhance experiences and increase support for the military community.

In September 2024, Psychological Medicine published a peer-reviewed research paper, "Detecting suicide risk among U.S. servicemembers and veterans: a deep learning approach using social media data," featuring RallyPoint's artificial intelligence / machine learning (AI/ML) work with researchers from MIT and Harvard.

In November 2025, RallyPoint announced the charitable project, "RallyPoint Serves," launched under the fiscal sponsorship of the 501(c)(3) public charity, Veterans Collaborative. RallyPoint Serves received $250,000 in funding from Jeff Bezos, Lauren Sánchez Bezos, retired Navy Admiral William H. McRaven, retired Admiral John C. Harvey Jr., Continuing to Serve foundation (via RallyPoint board member, Frances Dawn Halfaker), Hunt Family Foundation, and others.

In March 2026, RallyPoint.com was abruptly taken offline with no forewarning or explanation given. As of October 17, 2026, it has yet to be restored.

== Company ==
=== Website ===
RallyPoint was a professional network available to all US military members and veterans, described by Forbes as "LinkedIn on steroids for members of the military."

Information of users and connections was sorted based on the military structure, such as rank, specialty, duty position, and duty location.

According to the Huffington Post, RallyPoint is "solving two problems by creating both an easy-to-use professional network within the military, as well as the most technologically advanced employer-to-service member matching network in the country."
