= Drync =

- Developer: Drync LLC
- Release: 2008
- Written in: C
- Operating system: iOS
- Available in: English
- Type: Mobile app
- License: Trialware
- Website: drync.com

Drync is a wine mobile app for both iOS platforms developed by Drync LLC. The company was founded by Brad Rosen and Bill Kirtley. It is primarily a mobile software application that helps users to discover and buy wine. Drync mobile app provides reviews and comments for wines listed in its database. It claims to search about 10 databases including WineZap, Wine Searcher, and Snooth (which has its own app) through its wine search, discovery, and cellar management tool. The application allows users to scan a bottle's label, and it show pricing and ratings, as well as a place to make tasting notes on when wine was sipped. Drync LLC raised $900,000 from angel investors including Mark Hastings, Andrew Moss, and Jack Remondi.

== Versions ==
The first version was launched in 2008 and a new version was launched on 14 August 2014.
