= Spring Health =

Virtual mental health service

- Industry: Psychotherapy
- Founded: 2016; 10 years ago
- Founders: April Koh; Adam Chekroud; Abhishek Chandra
- Headquarters: New York, U.S.
- Area served: Worldwide
- Services: Employee assistance program
- Website: www.springhealth.com

Spring Health is an American digital mental health company that provides employee assistance programs and mental health benefits for employers and health plans. Founded in 2016 and based in New York City, Spring Health uses app-based cognitive exercises, coaching, therapy, and psychiatry, tailored by machine-learning algorithms. The company has become one of the highest-valued mental health startups, reaching a unicorn status with a $3.3 billion valuation by 2024.

== History ==
Spring Health was founded in 2016 by Yale University students April Koh, Adam Chekroud and Abhishek Chandra. Koh and Chandra conceived the idea while undergraduate at Yale University, after witnessing challenges in accessing timely mental health care. They connected with Chekroud, whose research demonstrated that machine learning could improve matching patients to effective treatments. The Spring Health concept won Koh and Chekroud Yale’s Thorne Prize for Social Innovation in 2016, providing seed funding for the venture.

Spring Health raised several rounds of venture capital. It secured $6 million in seed funding by 2018. In September 2021, Spring Health closed a $190 million Series C financing led by Kinnevik, which valued the company at about $2 billion. This valuation made Koh, then 29, the youngest woman to lead a multibillion-dollar startup at that time. The Series C also included investment from Guardian Life Insurance to integrate Spring Health’s services into insurance products.

In 2023, Spring Health raised an additional $71 million in funding at a $2.5 billion valuation. In 2025, the company was valued at $3.3 billion, and was available in more than 200 countries. In January 2026, Spring Health announced an agreement to acquire Alma, a platform for independent mental health clinicians; the acquisition was completed on May 1.

== Services ==
Spring Health’s platform offers mental health services for employees and their families. These include self-guided online cognitive behavioral exercises, coaching, clinical therapy sessions, and medication management through psychiatrists. The company markets itself as a modern alternative or supplement to traditional employee assistance programs (EAPs). It emphasizes precision mental healthcare by using data and machine-learning models to match people with the “right” type of care, aiming to reduce the trial-and-error often involved in finding effective mental health treatment. The algorithm refines its recommendations over time as more data is collected. In addition to virtual services, Spring Health can connect members to in-person providers or specialists when needed. The platform uses both a mobile app and a web portal, and is offered as a benefit through employers or health insurance partnerships.

== Recognition ==
- In 2026, Spring Health was included on Time Magazine's list of the 100 Most Influential Companies

== Controversies ==
Despite its mission to improve mental well-being, Spring Health has faced criticism for its internal work culture. In late 2021, Business Insider reported that the startup’s intense, “fast-paced” work environment had led to employee burnout and high turnover. Koh acknowledged in an email to staff that burnout had become a systemic problem within the company and pledged to improve internal support and workplace conditions.

In November 2024, California's Department of Managed Health Care (DMHC) fined Spring Health $1 million for operating an unlicensed health service plan. Regulators found that Spring Health had been administering behavioral health benefits to over 370,000 employees in California without the proper state license. Spring Health acknowledged the violation, agreed to pay the penalty, and took steps to secure the appropriate license to continue its services in California legally.
