= Ministry of Supply (clothing) =

American fashion brand

- Company type: Private
- Industry: Fashion
- Founded: 2012; 14 years ago
- Founders: Gihan Amarasiriwardena, Kevin Rustagi, Kit Hickey, Aman Advani
- Headquarters: Boston, Massachusetts, United States
- Products: Business attire, performance clothing
- Website: ministryofsupply.com

Ministry of Supply is an American fashion brand based in Boston, Massachusetts, specializing in men's and women's business wear and performance clothing. Founded in 2012 by former Massachusetts Institute of Technology (MIT) students Gihan Amarasiriwardena, Kevin Rustagi, Kit Hickey, and Aman Advani, the company incorporates advanced materials, such as those used in NASA spacesuits, to create attire with temperature regulation, moisture management, and flexibility.

The company primarily sells through its website and operates retail stores in Boston, Washington, D.C., and San Francisco.

== History ==
Ministry of Supply, named after the British Ministry of Supply established in 1939 to manage equipment distribution during World War II, was co-founded in 2012 by Gihan Amarasiriwardena, Kevin Rustagi, Kit Hickey, and Aman Advani, all former Massachusetts Institute of Technology (MIT) students. The company emerged from its vision to create high-performance, technology-driven professional attire inspired by advancements in sportswear fabrics.

In 2012, after over a year of product development, the Ministry of Supply launched a Kickstarter campaign to fund their first product: a synthetic knit-blend dress shirt designed with heat and moisture management, odor control, and enhanced mobility. The campaign raised over $429,000, surpassing its $30,000 goal and setting a Kickstarter record for fashion at the time.

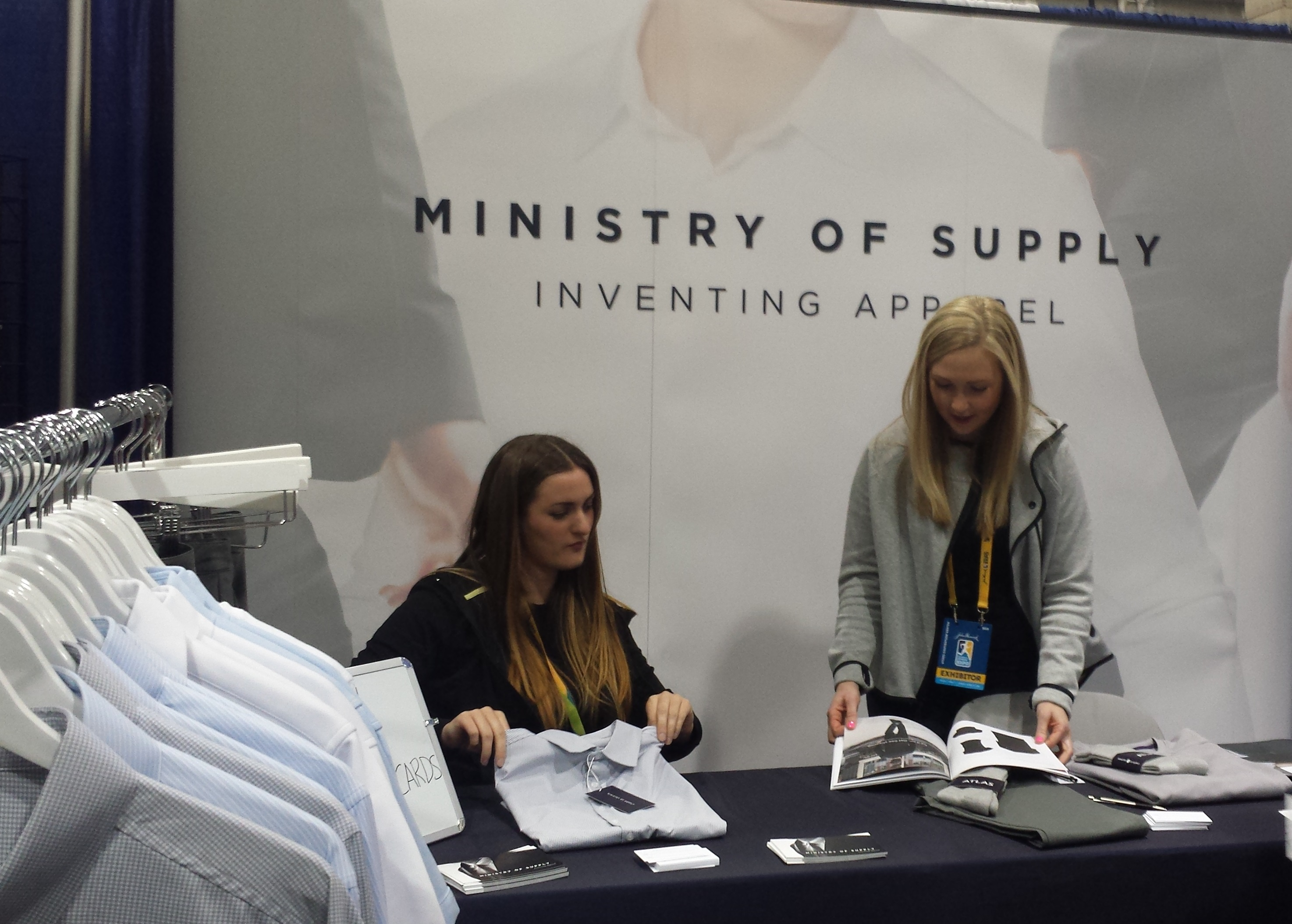
The Ministry of Supply display at the Boston Marathon Expo.

In June 2013, the company returned to Kickstarter to fund the ATLAS dress sock, incorporating similar performance-driven features. The campaign raised over $200,000, further validating their business model. Later that year, in September 2013, Ministry of Supply secured $1.1 million in seed round financing from investors including VegasTechFund, SK Ventures, and Boston Red Sox pitcher Craig Breslow, whose investment was inspired by a gift of one of their shirts.

By 2015, the company had expanded its presence, showcasing products at events like the Boston Marathon Expo. Ministry of Supply grew its product line to include jackets, pants, and women's clothing.

In 2023, the company introduced new fabric technologies, including temperature-regulating materials developed in collaboration with MIT's Self-Assembly Lab.

== Design and innovation ==
Ministry of Supply integrates aerospace engineering, textile engineering, and thermal analysis to design business attire with enhanced comfort and performance. Its products use materials like phase-change fabrics, originally developed for NASA, to regulate body temperature, alongside stretchable and moisture-wicking fibers. The company employs 3D printing and computer-aided design to create tailored fits and reduce waste.

The design process involves beta testing with customers to refine products based on feedback, ensuring functionality and fit. Ministry of Supply also prioritizes sustainability, using recycled materials and eco-friendly production methods.

== Retail and operations ==
Ministry of Supply operates an e-commerce platform and physical stores in Boston’s Newbury Street, Washington, D.C., and San Francisco. The company has experimented with pop-up stores and partnerships, such as displays at the Boston Marathon Expo. Its Boston headquarters includes a design lab for prototyping and testing new apparel technologies.
