= Principia Mathematica =

3-volume treatise on mathematics, 1910–1913

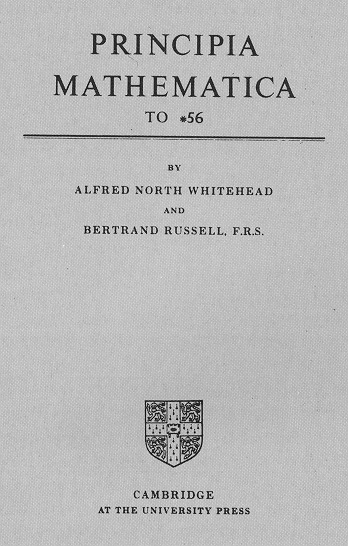
- The title page of the shortened Principia Mathematica to ✱56
- Author: Alfred North Whitehead; Bertrand Russell
- Language: English
- Subject: Foundations of mathematics
- Publisher: Cambridge University Press
- Publication date: 1910–1913
- Text: Principia Mathematica at Wikisource

The Principia Mathematica (often abbreviated PM) is a three-volume work on the foundations of mathematics written by the mathematician–philosophers Alfred North Whitehead and Bertrand Russell and published in 1910, 1912, and 1913. In 1925–1927, it appeared in a second edition with an important Introduction to the Second Edition, an Appendix A (that replaced ✱9), and with an additional new Appendix B and Appendix C. PM was conceived as a sequel to Russell's 1903 The Principles of Mathematics, but as PM states, this became an unworkable suggestion for practical and philosophical reasons:

"The present work was originally intended by us to be comprised in a second volume of Principles of Mathematics ... But as we advanced, it became increasingly evident that the subject is a very much larger one than we had supposed; moreover on many fundamental questions which had been left obscure and doubtful in the former work, we have now arrived at what we believe to be satisfactory solutions."

PM, according to its introduction, had three aims:

1. to analyse to the greatest possible extent the ideas and methods of mathematical logic and to minimise the number of primitive notions, axioms, and inference rules;
2. to precisely express mathematical propositions in symbolic logic using the most convenient notation that precise expression allows;
3. to solve the paradoxes that plagued logic and set theory at the turn of the 20th century, like Russell's paradox.

This third aim motivated the adoption of the theory of types in PM. The theory of types adopts grammatical restrictions on formulas that rule out the unrestricted comprehension of classes, properties, and functions. The effect of this is that formulas such as would allow the comprehension of objects like the Russell set turn out to be ill-formed: they violate the grammatical restrictions of the system of PM.

PM sparked interest in symbolic logic and advanced the subject, popularizing it and demonstrating its power. The Modern Library placed PM 23rd in their list of the top 100 English-language nonfiction books of the 20th century.

== Scope of foundations laid ==
The Principia covered only set theory, cardinal numbers, ordinal numbers, and real numbers. Deeper theorems from real analysis were not included, but by the end of the third volume it was clear to experts that a large amount of known mathematics could in principle be developed in the adopted formalism. It was also clear how lengthy such a development would be.

A fourth volume on the foundations of geometry had been planned, but the authors admitted to intellectual exhaustion upon completion of the third.

== Theoretical basis ==
As noted in the criticism of the theory by Kurt Gödel (below), unlike a formalist theory, the "logicistic" theory of PM has no "precise statement of the syntax of the formalism". Furthermore in the theory, it is almost immediately observable that interpretations (in the sense of model theory) are presented in terms of truth-values for the behaviour of the symbols "⊢" (assertion of truth), "∾" (logical not), and "V" (logical inclusive OR).

Truth-values: PM embeds the notions of "truth" and "falsity" in the notion "primitive proposition". A raw (pure) formalist theory would not provide the meaning of the symbols that form a "primitive proposition"—the symbols themselves could be absolutely arbitrary and unfamiliar. The theory would specify only how the symbols behave based on the grammar of the theory. Then later, by assignment of "values", a model would specify an interpretation of what the formulas are saying. Thus in the formal Kleene symbol set below, the "interpretation" of what the symbols commonly mean, and by implication how they end up being used, is given in parentheses, e.g., "¬ (not)". But this is not a pure Formalist theory.

=== Contemporary construction of a formal theory ===
List of propositions referred to by names.

The following formalist theory is offered as contrast to the logicistic theory of PM. A contemporary formal system would be constructed as follows:

1. Symbols used: This set is the starting set, and other symbols can appear but only by definition from these beginning symbols. A starting set might be the following set derived from Kleene 1952:
  - logical symbols:
    - "→" (implies, IF-THEN, and "⊃"),
    - "&" (and),
    - "∨" (or),
    - "¬" (not),
    - "∀" (for all),
    - "∃" (there exists);
  - predicate symbol: "=" (equals);
  - function symbols:
    - "+" (arithmetic addition),
    - "∙" (arithmetic multiplication),
    - " ′ " (successor);
  - individual symbol "0" (zero);
  - variables "a", "b", "c", etc.; and
  - parentheses "(" and ")".
2. Symbol strings: The theory will build "strings" of these symbols by concatenation (juxtaposition).
3. Formation rules: The theory specifies the rules of syntax (rules of grammar) usually as a recursive definition that starts with "0" and specifies how to build acceptable strings or "well-formed formulas" (wffs). This includes a rule for "substitution" of strings for the symbols called "variables".
4. Transformation rule(s): The axioms that specify the behaviours of the symbols and symbol sequences.
5. Rule of inference, detachment, modus ponens : The rule that allows the theory to "detach" a "conclusion" from the "premises" that led up to it, and thereafter to discard the "premises" (symbols to the left of the line │, or symbols above the line if horizontal). If this were not the case, then substitution would result in longer and longer strings that have to be carried forward. Indeed, after the application of modus ponens, nothing is left but the conclusion, the rest disappears forever.
  Contemporary theories often specify as their first axiom the classical or modus ponens or "the rule of detachment":
  A, A ⊃ B | B
  The symbol "│" is usually written as a vertical line, here "⊃" means "implies". The symbols A and B are "stand-ins" for strings; this form of notation is called an "axiom schema" (i.e., there is a countable number of specific forms the notation could take). This can be read in a manner similar to IF-THEN but with a difference: given symbol string IF A and A implies B THEN B (and retain only B for further use). But the symbols have no "interpretation" (e.g., no "truth table" or "truth values" or "truth functions") and modus ponens proceeds mechanistically, by grammar alone.

=== Construction ===
The theory of PM has both significant similarities, and similar differences, to a contemporary formal theory. Kleene states that "this deduction of mathematics from logic was offered as intuitive axiomatics. The axioms were intended to be believed, or at least to be accepted as plausible hypotheses concerning the world". Indeed, unlike a Formalist theory that manipulates symbols according to rules of grammar, PM introduces the notion of "truth-values", i.e., truth and falsity in the real-world sense, and the "assertion of truth" almost immediately as the fifth and sixth elements in the structure of the theory (PM 1962:4–36):

1. Variables
2. Uses of various letters
3. The fundamental functions of propositions: "the Contradictory Function" symbolised by "∾" and the "Logical Sum or Disjunctive Function" symbolised by "∨" being taken as primitive and logical implication defined (the following example also used to illustrate 9. Definition below) as
  p ⊃ q .=. ∾ p ∨ q Df. (PM 1962:11)
  and logical product defined as
  p . q .=. ∾(∾p ∨ ∾q) Df. (PM 1962:12)
4. Equivalence: Logical equivalence, not arithmetic equivalence: "≡" given as a demonstration of how the symbols are used, i.e., "Thus ' p ≡ q ' stands for '( p ⊃ q ) . ( q ⊃ p )'." (PM 1962:7). Notice that to discuss a notation PM identifies a "meta"-notation with "[space] ... [space]":
  Logical equivalence appears again as a definition:
  p ≡ q .=. ( p ⊃ q ) . ( q ⊃ p ) (PM 1962:12),
  Notice the appearance of parentheses. This grammatical usage is not specified and appears sporadically; parentheses do play an important role in symbol strings, however, e.g., the notation "(x)" for the contemporary "∀x".
5. Truth-values: "The 'Truth-value' of a proposition is truth if it is true, and falsehood if it is false" (this phrase is due to Gottlob Frege) (PM 1962:7).
6. Assertion-sign: "'⊦. p may be read 'it is true that' ... thus '⊦: p .⊃. q ' means 'it is true that p implies q ', whereas '⊦. p .⊃⊦. q ' means ' p is true; therefore q is true'. The first of these does not necessarily involve the truth either of p or of q, while the second involves the truth of both" (PM 1962:92).
7. Inference: PM's version of modus ponens. "[If] '⊦. p ' and '⊦ (p ⊃ q)' have occurred, then '⊦ . q ' will occur if it is desired to put it on record. The process of the inference cannot be reduced to symbols. Its sole record is the occurrence of '⊦. q ' [in other words, the symbols on the left disappear or can be erased]" (PM 1962:9).
8. The use of dots
9. Definitions: These use the "=" sign with "Df" at the right end.
10. Summary of preceding statements: brief discussion of the primitive ideas "∾ p" and "p ∨ q" and "⊦" prefixed to a proposition.
11. Primitive propositions: the axioms or postulates. This was significantly modified in the second edition.
12. Propositional functions: The notion of "proposition" was significantly modified in the second edition, including the introduction of "atomic" propositions linked by logical signs to form "molecular" propositions, and the use of substitution of molecular propositions into atomic or molecular propositions to create new expressions.
13. The range of values and total variation
14. Ambiguous assertion and the real variable: This and the next two sections were modified or abandoned in the second edition. In particular, the distinction between the concepts defined in sections 15. Definition and the real variable and 16 Propositions connecting real and apparent variables was abandoned in the second edition.
15. Formal implication and formal equivalence
16. Identity
17. Classes and relations
18. Various descriptive functions of relations
19. Plural descriptive functions
20. Unit classes

=== Primitive ideas ===
Cf. PM 1962:90–94, for the first edition:

- (1) Elementary propositions.
- (2) Elementary propositions of functions.
- (3) Assertion: introduces the notions of "truth" and "falsity".
- (4) Assertion of a propositional function.
- (5) Negation: "If p is any proposition, the proposition "not-p", or "p is false," will be represented by "∾p" ".
- (6) Disjunction: "If p and q are any propositions, the proposition "p or q, i.e., "either p is true or q is true," where the alternatives are to be not mutually exclusive, will be represented by "p ∨ q" ".
- (cf. section B)

=== Primitive propositions ===
The first edition (see discussion relative to the second edition, below) begins with a definition of the sign "⊃"

✱1.01. p ⊃ q .=. ∾ p ∨ q. Df.

✱1.1. Anything implied by a true elementary proposition is true. Pp modus ponens

(✱1.11 was abandoned in the second edition.)

✱1.2. ⊦: p ∨ p .⊃. p. Pp principle of tautology

✱1.3. ⊦: q .⊃. p ∨ q. Pp principle of addition

✱1.4. ⊦: p ∨ q .⊃. q ∨ p. Pp principle of permutation

✱1.5. ⊦: p ∨ ( q ∨ r ) .⊃. q ∨ ( p ∨ r ). Pp associative principle

✱1.6. ⊦:. q ⊃ r .⊃: p ∨ q .⊃. p ∨ r. Pp principle of summation

✱1.7. If p is an elementary proposition, ∾p is an elementary proposition. Pp

✱1.71. If p and q are elementary propositions, p ∨ q is an elementary proposition. Pp

✱1.72. If φp and ψp are elementary propositional functions which take elementary propositions as arguments, φp ∨ ψp is an elementary proposition. Pp

Together with the "Introduction to the Second Edition", the second edition's Appendix A abandons the entire section ✱9. This includes six primitive propositions ✱9 through ✱9.15 together with the Axioms of reducibility.

The revised theory is made difficult by the introduction of the Sheffer stroke ("|") to symbolise "incompatibility" (i.e., if both elementary propositions p and q are true, their "stroke" p | q is false), the contemporary logical NAND (not-AND). In the revised theory, the Introduction presents the notion of "atomic proposition", a "datum" that "belongs to the philosophical part of logic". These have no parts that are propositions and do not contain the notions "all" or "some". For example: "this is red", or "this is earlier than that". Such things can exist ad finitum, i.e., even an "infinite enumeration" of them to replace "generality" (i.e., the notion of "for all"). PM then "advance[s] to molecular propositions" that are all linked by "the stroke". Definitions give equivalences for "∾", "∨", "⊃", and ".".

The new introduction defines "elementary propositions" as atomic and molecular positions together. It then replaces all the primitive propositions ✱1.2 to ✱1.72 with a single primitive proposition framed in terms of the stroke:

"If p, q, r are elementary propositions, given p and p|(q|r), we can infer r. This is a primitive proposition."

The new introduction keeps the notation for "there exists" (now recast as "sometimes true") and "for all" (recast as "always true"). Appendix A strengthens the notion of "matrix" or "predicative function" (a "primitive idea", PM 1962:164) and presents four new Primitive propositions as ✱8.1–✱8.13.

✱88. Multiplicative axiom

✱120. Axiom of infinity

== Ramified types and the axiom of reducibility ==
In simple type theory objects are elements of various disjoint "types". Types are implicitly built up as follows. If τ_{1},...,τ_{m} are types then there is a type (τ_{1},...,τ_{m}) that can be thought of as the class of propositional functions of τ_{1},...,τ_{m} (which in set theory is essentially the set of subsets of τ_{1}×...×τ_{m}). In particular there is a type () of propositions, and there may be a type ι (iota) of "individuals" from which other types are built. Russell and Whitehead's notation for building up types from other types is rather cumbersome, and the notation here is due to Church.

In the ramified type theory of PM all objects are elements of various disjoint ramified types. Ramified types are implicitly built up as follows. If τ_{1},...,τ_{m},σ_{1},...,σ_{n} are ramified types then as in simple type theory there is a type (τ_{1},...,τ_{m},σ_{1},...,σ_{n}) of "predicative" propositional functions of τ_{1},...,τ_{m},σ_{1},...,σ_{n}. However, there are also ramified types (τ_{1},...,τ_{m}|σ_{1},...,σ_{n}) that can be thought of as the classes of propositional functions of τ_{1},...τ_{m} obtained from propositional functions of type (τ_{1},...,τ_{m},σ_{1},...,σ_{n}) by quantifying over σ_{1},...,σ_{n}. When n=0 (so there are no σs) these propositional functions are called predicative functions or matrices. This can be confusing because modern mathematical practice does not distinguish between predicative and non-predicative functions, and in any case PM never defines exactly what a "predicative function" actually is: this is taken as a primitive notion.

Russell and Whitehead found it impossible to develop mathematics while maintaining the difference between predicative and non-predicative functions, so they introduced the axiom of reducibility, saying that for every non-predicative function there is a predicative function taking the same values. In practice this axiom essentially means that the elements of type (τ_{1},...,τ_{m}|σ_{1},...,σ_{n}) can be identified with the elements of type (τ_{1},...,τ_{m}), which causes the hierarchy of ramified types to collapse down to simple type theory. (Strictly speaking, PM allows two propositional functions to be different even if they take the same values on all arguments; this differs from modern mathematical practice where one normally identifies two such functions.)

In Zermelo set theory one can model the ramified type theory of PM as follows. One picks a set ι to be the type of individuals. For example, ι might be the set of natural numbers, or the set of atoms (in a set theory with atoms) or any other set one is interested in. Then if τ_{1},...,τ_{m} are types, the type (τ_{1},...,τ_{m}) is the power set of the product τ_{1}×...×τ_{m}, which can also be thought of informally as the set of (propositional predicative) functions from this product to a 2-element set {true,false}. The ramified type (τ_{1},...,τ_{m}|σ_{1},...,σ_{n}) can be modelled as the product of the type (τ_{1},...,τ_{m},σ_{1},...,σ_{n}) with the set of sequences of n quantifiers (∀ or ∃) indicating which quantifier should be applied to each variable σ_{i}. (One can vary this slightly by allowing the σs to be quantified in any order, or allowing them to occur before some of the τs, but this makes little difference except to the bookkeeping.)

The introduction to the second edition cautions:

One point in regard to which improvement is obviously desirable is the axiom of reducibility ... . This axiom has a purely pragmatic justification ... but it is clearly not the sort of axiom with which we can rest content. On this subject, however, it cannot be said that a satisfactory solution is yet obtainable. Dr Leon Chwistek [Theory of Constructive Types] took the heroic course of dispensing with the axiom without adopting any substitute; from his work it is clear that this course compels us to sacrifice a great deal of ordinary mathematics. There is another course, recommended by Wittgenstein† (†Tractatus Logico-Philosophicus, *5.54ff) for philosophical reasons. This is to assume that functions of propositions are always truth-functions, and that a function can only occur in a proposition through its values. (...) [Working through the consequences] ... the theory of inductive cardinals and ordinals survives; but it seems that the theory of infinite Dedekindian and well-ordered series largely collapses, so that irrationals, and real numbers generally, can no longer be adequately dealt with. Also Cantor's proof that 2n > n breaks down unless n is finite.

It might be possible to sacrifice infinite well-ordered series to logical rigour, but the theory of real numbers is an integral part of ordinary mathematics, and can hardly be the subject of reasonable doubt. We are therefore justified (sic) in supposing that some logical axioms which is true will justify it. The axiom required may be more restricted than the axiom of reducibility, but if so, it remains to be discovered.

== Notation ==
I can remember Bertrand Russell telling me of a horrible dream. He was in the top floor of the University Library, about A.D. 2100. A library assistant was going round the shelves carrying an enormous bucket, taking down books, glancing at them, restoring them to the shelves or dumping them into the bucket. At last he came to three large volumes which Russell could recognize as the last surviving copy of Principia Mathematica. He took down one of the volumes, turned over a few pages, seemed puzzled for a moment by the curious symbolism, closed the volume, balanced it in his hand and hesitated....

— G. H. Hardy, A Mathematician's Apology (1940)

Irvine in the Stanford Encyclopedia of Philosophy observes that "The notation in that work has been superseded by the subsequent development of logic during the 20th century, to the extent that the beginner has trouble reading PM at all"; while much of the symbolic content can be converted to modern notation, the original notation itself is "a subject of scholarly dispute", and some notation "embodies substantive logical doctrines so that it cannot simply be replaced by contemporary symbolism".

Kurt Gödel was harshly critical of the notation: "What is missing, above all, is a precise statement of the syntax of the formalism. Syntactical considerations are omitted even in cases where they are necessary for the cogency of the proofs." This is reflected in the example below of the symbols "p", "q", "r" and "⊃" that can be formed into the string "p ⊃ q ⊃ r". PM requires a definition of what this symbol-string means in terms of other symbols; in contemporary treatments the "formation rules" (syntactical rules leading to "well formed formulas") would have prevented the formation of this string.

Source of the notation: Chapter I "Preliminary Explanations of Ideas and Notations" begins with the source of the elementary parts of the notation (the symbols =⊃≡−ΛVε and the system of dots):

"The notation adopted in the present work is based upon that of Peano, and the following explanations are to some extent modeled on those which he prefixes to his Formulario Mathematico [i.e., Peano 1889]. His use of dots as brackets is adopted, and so are many of his symbols."

— (PM 1927:4)

PM changed Peano's Ɔ to ⊃, and also adopted a few of Peano's later symbols, such as ℩ and ι, and Peano's practice of turning letters upside down.

PM adopts the assertion sign "⊦" from Frege's Begriffsschrift (1879):

"(I)t may be read 'it is true that'"

Thus to assert a proposition p PM writes:

"⊦. p." (PM 1927:92)

(Observe that, as in the original, the left dot is square and of greater size than the full stop on the right.)

Most of the rest of the notation in PM was invented by Whitehead.

=== An introduction to the notation of "Section A Mathematical Logic" (formulas ✱1–✱5.71) ===
PM's dots are used in a manner similar to parentheses. Each dot (or multiple dot) represents either a left or right parenthesis or the logical symbol ∧. The number of dots indicates the "depth" of the parentheses, for example, ".", ":" or ":.", "::". However the position of the matching right or left parenthesis is not indicated explicitly in the notation but has to be deduced from some rules that are complex and at times ambiguous. Moreover, when the dots stand for a logical symbol ∧ its left and right operands have to be deduced using similar rules. First one has to decide based on context whether the dots stand for a left or right parenthesis or a logical symbol. Then one has to decide how far the other corresponding parenthesis is: here one carries on until one meets either a larger number of dots, or the same number of dots next that have equal or greater "force", or the end of the line. Dots next to the signs ⊃, ≡,∨, =Df have greater force than dots next to (x), (∃x) and so on, which have greater force than dots indicating a logical product ∧.

Example 1. The line

✱3.4. ⊢ : p . q . ⊃ . p ⊃ q

corresponds to

⊢ ((p ∧ q) ⊃ (p ⊃ q)).

The two dots standing together immediately following the assertion sign indicate that what is asserted is the entire line: since there are two of them, their scope is greater than that of any of the single dots to their right. They are replaced by a left parenthesis standing where the dots are and a right parenthesis at the end of the formula, thus:

⊢ (p . q . ⊃ . p ⊃ q).

(In practice, these outermost parentheses, which enclose an entire formula, are usually suppressed.) The first of the single dots, standing between two propositional variables, represents conjunction. It belongs to the third group and has the narrowest scope. Here it is replaced by the modern symbol for conjunction "∧", thus

⊢ (p ∧ q . ⊃ . p ⊃ q).

The two remaining single dots pick out the main connective of the whole formula. They illustrate the utility of the dot notation in picking out those connectives which are relatively more important than the ones which surround them. The one to the left of the "⊃" is replaced by a pair of parentheses, the right one goes where the dot is and the left one goes as far to the left as it can without crossing a group of dots of greater force, in this case the two dots which follow the assertion sign, thus

⊢ ((p ∧ q) ⊃ . p ⊃ q)

The dot to the right of the "⊃" is replaced by a left parenthesis which goes where the dot is and a right parenthesis which goes as far to the right as it can without going beyond the scope already established by a group of dots of greater force (in this case the two dots which followed the assertion sign). So the right parenthesis which replaces the dot to the right of the "⊃" is placed in front of the right parenthesis which replaced the two dots following the assertion sign, thus

⊢ ((p ∧ q) ⊃ (p ⊃ q)).

Example 2, with double, triple, and quadruple dots:

✱9.521. ⊢ : : (∃x). φx . ⊃ . q : ⊃ : . (∃x). φx . v . r : ⊃ . q v r

stands for

((((∃x)(φx)) ⊃ (q)) ⊃ ((((∃x) (φx)) v (r)) ⊃ (q v r)))

Example 3, with a double dot indicating a logical symbol (from volume 1, page 10):

p⊃q:q⊃r.⊃.p⊃r

stands for

(p⊃q) ∧ ((q⊃r)⊃(p⊃r))

where the double dot represents the logical symbol ∧ and can be viewed as having the higher priority as a non-logical single dot.

Later in section ✱14, brackets "[ ]" appear, and in sections ✱20 and following, braces "{ }" appear. Whether these symbols have specific meanings or are just for visual clarification is unclear. Unfortunately the single dot (but also ":", ":.", "::", etc.) is also used to symbolise "logical product" (contemporary logical AND often symbolised by "&" or "∧").

Logical implication is represented by Peano's "Ɔ" simplified to "⊃", logical negation is symbolised by a large curly tilde, i.e., "∾" (contemporary "~" but not "¬"), the logical OR by "v". The symbol "=" together with "Df" is used to indicate "is defined as", whereas in sections ✱13 and following, "=" /without/ a matching "Df" is defined as (mathematically) "identical with", i.e., contemporary mathematical "equality" (cf. discussion in section ✱13). Logical equivalence is represented by "≡" (contemporary "if and only if"); "elementary" propositional functions are written in the customary way, e.g., "f(p)", but later the function sign appears directly before the variable without parenthesis e.g., "φx", "χx", etc.

Example, PM introduces the definition of "logical product" as follows:

✱3.01. p . q .=. ∾(∾p v ∾q) Df.

where "p . q" is the logical product of p and q.

✱3.02. p ⊃ q ⊃ r .=. p ⊃ q . q ⊃ r Df.

This definition serves merely to abbreviate proofs.

Translation of the formulas into contemporary symbols: Various authors use alternate symbols, so no definitive translation can be given. However, because of criticisms such as that of Kurt Gödel below, the best contemporary treatments will be very precise with respect to the "formation rules" (the syntax) of the formulas.

The first formula might be converted into modern symbolism as follows:

(p & q) =_{df} (∾(∾p v ∾q))

The second formula might be converted as follows:

(p → q → r) =_{df} (p → q) & (q → r)

But note that this is not (logically) equivalent to (p → (q → r)) nor to ((p → q) → r), and these two are not logically equivalent either.

=== An introduction to the notation of "Section B Theory of Apparent Variables" (formulas ✱8–✱14.34) ===
These sections concern what is now known as predicate logic, and predicate logic with identity (equality).

- NB: As a result of criticism and advances, the second edition of PM (1927) replaces ✱9 with a new ✱8 (Appendix A). This new section eliminates the first edition's distinction between real and apparent variables, and it eliminates "the primitive idea 'assertion of a propositional function'. To add to the complexity of the treatment, ✱8 introduces the notion of substituting a "matrix", and the Sheffer stroke:

- Matrix: In contemporary usage, PM's matrix is (at least for propositional functions), a truth table, i.e., all truth-values of a propositional or predicate function.
- Sheffer stroke: Is the contemporary logical NAND (NOT-AND), i.e., "incompatibility", meaning:

"Given two propositions p and q, then ' p | q ' means "proposition p is incompatible with proposition q", i.e., if both propositions p and q evaluate as true, then and only then p | q evaluates as false." After section ✱8 the Sheffer stroke sees no usage.

Section ✱10: The existential and universal "operators": PM adds "(x)" to represent the contemporary symbolism "for all x " i.e., " ∀x", and it uses a backward serifed E to represent "there exists an x", i.e., "(Ǝx)", i.e., the contemporary "∃x". The typical notation would be similar to the following:

"(x) . φx" means "for all values of variable x, function φ evaluates to true"
"(Ǝx) . φx" means "for some value of variable x, function φ evaluates to true"

Sections ✱10, ✱11, ✱12: Properties of a variable extended to all individuals: section ✱10 introduces the notion of "a property" of a "variable". PM gives the example: φ is a function that indicates "is a Greek", and ψ indicates "is a man", and χ indicates "is a mortal" these functions then apply to a variable x. PM can now write, and evaluate:

(x) . ψx

The notation above means "for all x, x is a man". Given a collection of individuals, one can evaluate the above formula for truth or falsity. For example, given the restricted collection of individuals { Socrates, Plato, Russell, Zeus } the above evaluates to "true" if we allow for Zeus to be a man. But it fails for:

(x) . φx

because Russell is not Greek. And it fails for

(x) . χx

because Zeus is not a mortal.

Equipped with this notation PM can create formulas to express the following: "If all Greeks are men and if all men are mortals then all Greeks are mortals". (PM 1962:138)

(x) . φx ⊃ ψx :(x). ψx ⊃ χx :⊃: (x) . φx ⊃ χx

Another example: the formula:

✱10.01. (Ǝx). φx . = . ∾(x) . ∾φx Df.

means "The symbols representing the assertion 'There exists at least one x that satisfies function φ' is defined by the symbols representing the assertion 'It's not true that, given all values of x, there are no values of x satisfying φ'".

The symbolisms ⊃_{x} and "≡_{x}" appear at ✱10.02 and ✱10.03. Both are abbreviations for universality (i.e., for all) that bind the variable x to the logical operator. Contemporary notation would have simply used parentheses outside of the equality ("=") sign:

✱10.02 φx ⊃_{x} ψx .=. (x). φx ⊃ ψx Df

Contemporary notation: ∀x(φ(x) → ψ(x)) (or a variant)

✱10.03 φx ≡_{x} ψx .=. (x). φx ≡ ψx Df

Contemporary notation: ∀x(φ(x) ↔︎ ψ(x)) (or a variant)

PM attributes the first symbolism to Peano.

Section ✱11 applies this symbolism to two variables. Thus the following notations: ⊃_{x}, ⊃_{y}, ⊃_{x, y} could all appear in a single formula.

Section ✱12 reintroduces the notion of "matrix" (contemporary truth table), the notion of logical types, and in particular the notions of first-order and second-order functions and propositions.

New symbolism "φ ! x" represents any value of a first-order function. If a circumflex "^" is placed over a variable, then this is an "individual" value of y, meaning that "ŷ" indicates "individuals" (e.g., a row in a truth table); this distinction is necessary because of the matrix/extensional nature of propositional functions.

Now equipped with the matrix notion, PM can assert its controversial axiom of reducibility: a function of one or two variables (two being sufficient for PM's use) where all its values are given (i.e., in its matrix) is (logically) equivalent ("≡") to some "predicative" function of the same variables. The one-variable definition is given below as an illustration of the notation (PM 1962:166–167):

✱12.1 ⊢: (Ǝ f): φx .≡_{x}. f ! x Pp;

Pp is a "Primitive proposition" ("Propositions assumed without proof") (PM 1962:12, i.e., contemporary "axioms"), adding to the 7 defined in section ✱1 (starting with ✱1.1 modus ponens). These are to be distinguished from the "primitive ideas" that include the assertion sign "⊢", negation "∾", logical OR "V", the notions of "elementary proposition" and "elementary propositional function"; these are as close as PM comes to rules of notational formation, i.e., syntax.

This means: "We assert the truth of the following: There exists a function f with the property that: given all values of x, their evaluations in function φ (i.e., resulting their matrix) is logically equivalent to some f evaluated at those same values of x. (and vice versa, hence logical equivalence)". In other words: given a matrix determined by property φ applied to variable x, there exists a function f that, when applied to the x is logically equivalent to the matrix. Or: every matrix φx can be represented by a function f applied to x, and vice versa.

✱13: The identity operator "=" : This is a definition that uses the sign in two different ways, as noted by the quote from PM:

✱13.01. x = y .=: (φ): φ ! x . ⊃ . φ ! y Df

means:

"This definition states that x and y are to be called identical when every predicative function satisfied by x is also satisfied by y ... Note that the second sign of equality in the above definition is combined with "Df", and thus is not really the same symbol as the sign of equality which is defined".

The not-equals sign "≠" makes its appearance as a definition at ✱13.02.

✱14: Descriptions:

"A description is a phrase of the form "the term y which satisfies φŷ, where φŷ is some function satisfied by one and only one argument."

From this PM employs two new symbols, a forward "E" and an inverted iota "℩". Here is an example:

✱14.02. E ! ( ℩y) (φy) .=: ( Ǝb):φy . ≡_{y} . y = b Df.

This has the meaning:

"The y satisfying φŷ exists," which holds when, and only when φŷ is satisfied by one value of y and by no other value." (PM 1967:173–174)

=== Introduction to the notation of the theory of classes and relations ===
The text leaps from section ✱14 directly to the foundational sections ✱20 GENERAL THEORY OF CLASSES and ✱21 GENERAL THEORY OF RELATIONS. "Relations" are what is known in contemporary set theory as sets of ordered pairs. Sections ✱20 and ✱22 introduce many of the symbols still in contemporary usage. These include the symbols "ε", "⊂", "∩", "∪", "–", "Λ", and "V": "ε" signifies "is an element of" (PM 1962:188); "⊂" (✱22.01) signifies "is contained in", "is a subset of"; "∩" (✱22.02) signifies the intersection (logical product) of classes (sets); "∪" (✱22.03) signifies the union (logical sum) of classes (sets); "–" (✱22.03) signifies negation of a class (set); "Λ" signifies the null class; and "V" signifies the universal class or universe of discourse.

Small Greek letters (other than "ε", "ι", "π", "φ", "ψ", "χ", and "θ") represent classes (e.g., "α", "β", "γ", "δ", etc.) (PM 1962:188):

x ε α

"The use of single letter in place of symbols such as ẑ(φz) or ẑ(φ ! z) is practically almost indispensable, since otherwise the notation rapidly becomes intolerably cumbrous. Thus ' x ε α' will mean ' x is a member of the class α'". (PM 1962:188)

α ∪ –α = V

The union of a set and its inverse is the universal (completed) set.

α ∩ –α = Λ

The intersection of a set and its inverse is the null (empty) set.

When applied to relations in section ✱23 CALCULUS OF RELATIONS, the symbols "⊂", "∩", "∪", and "–" acquire a dot: for example: "⊍", "∸".

The notion, and notation, of "a class" (set): In the first edition PM asserts that no new primitive ideas are necessary to define what is meant by "a class", and only two new "primitive propositions" called the axioms of reducibility for classes and relations respectively (PM 1962:25). But before this notion can be defined, PM feels it necessary to create a peculiar notation "ẑ(φz)" that it calls a "fictitious object". (PM 1962:188)

⊢: x ε ẑ(φz) .≡. (φx)

"i.e., ' x is a member of the class determined by (φẑ)' is [logically] equivalent to ' x satisfies (φẑ),' or to '(φx) is true.'". (PM 1962:25)

At least PM can tell the reader how these fictitious objects behave, because "A class is wholly determinate when its membership is known, that is, there cannot be two different classes having the same membership" (PM 1962:26). This is symbolised by the following equality (similar to ✱13.01 above:

ẑ(φz) = ẑ(ψz) . ≡ : (x): φx .≡. ψx

"This last is the distinguishing characteristic of classes, and justifies us in treating ẑ(ψz) as the class determined by [the function] ψẑ." (PM 1962:188)

Perhaps the above can be made clearer by the discussion of classes in Introduction to the Second Edition, which disposes of the Axiom of Reducibility and replaces it with the notion: "All functions of functions are extensional" (PM 1962:xxxix), i.e.,

φx ≡_{x} ψx .⊃. (x): ƒ(φẑ) ≡ ƒ(ψẑ) (PM 1962:xxxix)

This has the reasonable meaning that "IF for all values of x the truth-values of the functions φ and ψ of x are [logically] equivalent, THEN the function ƒ of a given φẑ and ƒ of ψẑ are [logically] equivalent." PM asserts this is "obvious":

"This is obvious, since φ can only occur in ƒ(φẑ) by the substitution of values of φ for p, q, r, ... in a [logical-] function, and, if φx ≡ ψx, the substitution of φx for p in a [logical-] function gives the same truth-value to the truth-function as the substitution of ψx. Consequently there is no longer any reason to distinguish between functions classes, for we have, in virtue of the above,
φx ≡_{x} ψx .⊃. (x). φẑ = . ψẑ".

Observe the change to the equality "=" sign on the right. PM goes on to state that will continue to hang onto the notation "ẑ(φz)", but this is merely equivalent to φẑ, and this is a class. (all quotes: PM 1962:xxxix).

== Consistency and criticisms ==
[Russell] said once, after some contact with the Chinese language, that he was horrified to find that the language of Principia Mathematica was an Indo-European one.

— John Edensor Littlewood, Littlewood's Miscellany (1986)

According to Carnap's "Logicist Foundations of Mathematics", Russell wanted a theory that could plausibly be said to derive all of mathematics from purely logical axioms. However, Principia Mathematica required, in addition to the basic axioms of type theory, three further axioms that seemed to not be true as mere matters of logic, namely the axiom of infinity, the axiom of choice, and the axiom of reducibility. Since the first two were existential axioms, Russell phrased mathematical statements depending on them as conditionals. But reducibility was required to be sure that the formal statements even properly express statements of real analysis, so that statements depending on it could not be reformulated as conditionals. Frank Ramsey tried to argue that Russell's ramification of the theory of types was unnecessary, so that reducibility could be removed, but these arguments seemed inconclusive.

Beyond the status of the axioms as logical truths, one can ask the following questions about any system such as PM:

- whether a contradiction could be derived from the axioms (the question of inconsistency), and
- whether there exists a mathematical statement which could neither be proven nor disproven in the system (the question of completeness).

Propositional logic itself was known to be consistent, but the same had not been established for Principia's axioms of set theory. (See Hilbert's second problem.) Russell and Whitehead suspected that the system in PM is incomplete: for example, they pointed out that it does not seem powerful enough to show that the cardinal ℵ_{ω} exists. However, one can ask if some recursively axiomatizable extension of it is complete and consistent.

=== Gödel 1930, 1931 ===
In 1930 Gödel's completeness theorem showed that first-order predicate logic itself was complete in a much weaker sense—that is, any sentence that is unprovable from a given set of axioms must actually be false in some model of the axioms. However, this is not the stronger sense of completeness desired for Principia Mathematica, since a given system of axioms (such as those of Principia Mathematica) may have many models, in some of which a given statement is true and in others of which that statement is false, so that the statement is left undecided by the axioms.

Gödel's incompleteness theorems cast unexpected light on these two related questions.

Gödel's first incompleteness theorem showed that no recursive extension of Principia could be both consistent and complete for arithmetic statements. (As mentioned above, Principia itself was already known to be incomplete for some non-arithmetic statements.) According to the theorem, within every sufficiently powerful recursive logical system (such as Principia), there exists a statement G that essentially reads, "The statement G cannot be proved." Such a statement is a sort of Catch-22: if G is provable, then it is false, and the system is therefore inconsistent; and if G is not provable, then it is true, and the system is therefore incomplete.

Gödel's second incompleteness theorem (1931) shows that no formal system extending basic arithmetic can be used to prove its own consistency. Thus, the statement "there are no contradictions in the Principia system" cannot be proven in the Principia system unless there are contradictions in the system (in which case it can be proven both true and false).

=== Wittgenstein 1919, 1939 ===
By the second edition of PM, Russell had removed his axiom of reducibility to a new axiom (although he does not state it as such). Gödel 1944:126 describes it this way:

This change is connected with the new axiom that functions can occur in propositions only "through their values", i.e., extensionally ... [this is] quite unobjectionable even from the constructive standpoint ... provided that quantifiers are always restricted to definite orders". This change from a quasi-intensional stance to a fully extensional stance also restricts predicate logic to the second order, i.e. functions of functions: "We can decide that mathematics is to confine itself to functions of functions which obey the above assumption".

— PM 2nd edition p. 401, Appendix C

This new proposal resulted in a dire outcome. An "extensional stance" and restriction to a second-order predicate logic means that a propositional function extended to all individuals such as "All 'x' are blue" now has to list all of the 'x' that satisfy (are true in) the proposition, listing them in a possibly infinite conjunction: e.g. x_{1} ∧ x_{2} ∧ . . . ∧ x_{n} ∧ . . .. Ironically, this change came about as the result of criticism from Ludwig Wittgenstein in his 1919 Tractatus Logico-Philosophicus. As described by Russell in the Introduction to the Second Edition of PM:

There is another course, recommended by Wittgenstein† (†Tractatus Logico-Philosophicus, *5.54ff) for philosophical reasons. This is to assume that functions of propositions are always truth-functions, and that a function can only occur in a proposition through its values. [...] [Working through the consequences] it appears that everything in Vol. I remains true (though often new proofs are required); the theory of inductive cardinals and ordinals survives; but it seems that the theory of infinite Dedekindian and well-ordered series largely collapses, so that irrationals, and real numbers generally, can no longer be adequately dealt with. Also Cantor's proof that 2^{n} > n breaks down unless n is finite."

— PM 2nd edition reprinted 1962:xiv, also cf. new Appendix C)

In other words, the fact that an infinite list cannot realistically be specified means that the concept of "number" in the infinite sense (i.e. the continuum) cannot be described by the new theory proposed in PM Second Edition.

Wittgenstein in his Lectures on the Foundations of Mathematics, Cambridge 1939 criticised Principia on various grounds, such as:

- It purports to reveal the fundamental basis for arithmetic. However, it is our everyday arithmetical practices such as counting which are fundamental; for if a persistent discrepancy arose between counting and Principia, this would be treated as evidence of an error in Principia (e.g., that Principia did not characterise numbers or addition correctly), not as evidence of an error in everyday counting.
- The calculating methods in Principia can only be used in practice with very small numbers. To calculate using large numbers (e.g., billions), the formulae would become too long, and some short-cut method would have to be used, which would no doubt rely on everyday techniques such as counting (or else on non-fundamental and hence questionable methods such as induction). So again Principia depends on everyday techniques, not vice versa.

Wittgenstein did, however, concede that Principia may nonetheless make some aspects of everyday arithmetic clearer.

=== Gödel 1944 ===
Gödel offered a "critical but sympathetic discussion of the logicistic order of ideas" in his 1944 article "Russell's Mathematical Logic". He wrote:

It is to be regretted that this first comprehensive and thorough-going presentation of a mathematical logic and the derivation of mathematics from it [is] so greatly lacking in formal precision in the foundations (contained in ✱1–✱21 of Principia [i.e., sections ✱1–✱5 (propositional logic), ✱8–14 (predicate logic with identity/equality), ✱20 (introduction to set theory), and ✱21 (introduction to relations theory)]) that it represents in this respect a considerable step backward as compared with Frege. What is missing, above all, is a precise statement of the syntax of the formalism. Syntactical considerations are omitted even in cases where they are necessary for the cogency of the proofs ... The matter is especially doubtful for the rule of substitution and of replacing defined symbols by their definiens ... it is chiefly the rule of substitution which would have to be proved.

== Contents ==
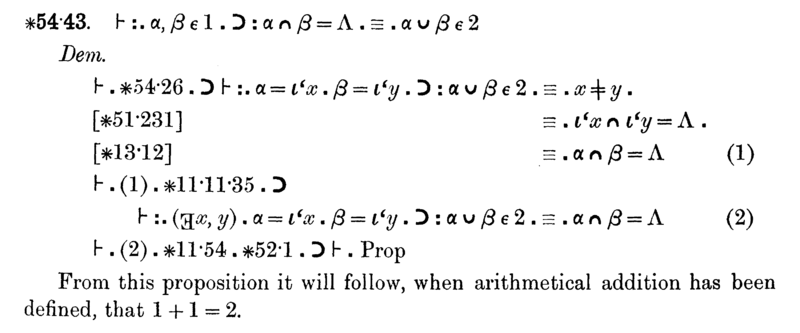
✱54.43: "From this proposition it will follow, when arithmetical addition has been defined, that 1 + 1 = 2." – Volume I, 1st edition, p. 379 (p. 362 in 2nd edition; p. 360 in abridged version). (The proof is actually completed in Volume II, 1st edition, page 86, accompanied by the comment, "The above proposition is occasionally useful." They go on to say "It is used at least three times, in ✱113.66 and ✱120.123.472.")

=== Part I Mathematical logic. Volume I ✱1 to ✱43 ===
This section describes the propositional and predicate calculus, and gives the basic properties of classes, relations, and types.

=== Part II Prolegomena to cardinal arithmetic. Volume I ✱50 to ✱97 ===
This part covers various properties of relations, especially those needed for cardinal arithmetic.

=== Part III Cardinal arithmetic. Volume II ✱100 to ✱126 ===
This covers the definition and basic properties of cardinals. A cardinal is defined to be an equivalence class of similar classes (as opposed to ZFC, where a cardinal is a special sort of von Neumann ordinal). Each type has its own collection of cardinals associated with it, and there is a considerable amount of bookkeeping necessary for comparing cardinals of different types. PM define addition, multiplication and exponentiation of cardinals, and compare different definitions of finite and infinite cardinals. ✱120.03 is the Axiom of infinity.

=== Part IV Relation-arithmetic. Volume II ✱150 to ✱186 ===
A "relation-number" is an equivalence class of isomorphic relations. PM defines analogues of addition, multiplication, and exponentiation for arbitrary relations. The addition and multiplication is similar to the usual definition of addition and multiplication of ordinals in ZFC, though the definition of exponentiation of relations in PM is not equivalent to the usual one used in ZFC.

=== Part V Series. Volume II ✱200 to ✱234 and volume III ✱250 to ✱276 ===
This covers series, which is PM's term for what is now called a totally ordered set. In particular it covers complete series, continuous functions between series with the order topology (though of course they do not use this terminology), well-ordered series, and series without "gaps" (those with a member strictly between any two given members).

=== Part VI Quantity. Volume III ✱300 to ✱375 ===
This section constructs the ring of integers, the fields of rational and real numbers, and "vector-families", which are related to what are now called torsors over abelian groups.

== Comparison with set theory ==
This section compares the system in PM with the usual mathematical foundations of ZFC. The system of PM is roughly comparable in strength with Zermelo set theory (or more precisely a version of it where the axiom of separation has all quantifiers bounded).

- The system of propositional logic and predicate calculus in PM is essentially the same as that used now, except that the notation and terminology has changed.
- The most obvious difference between PM and set theory is that in PM all objects belong to one of a number of disjoint types. This means that everything gets duplicated for each (infinite) type: for example, each type has its own ordinals, cardinals, real numbers, and so on. This results in a lot of bookkeeping to relate the various types with each other.
- In ZFC functions are normally coded as sets of ordered pairs. In PM functions are treated rather differently. First of all, "function" means "propositional function", something taking values true or false. Second, functions are not determined by their values: it is possible to have several different functions all taking the same values (for example, one might regard 2x+2 and 2(x+1) as different functions on grounds that the computer programs for evaluating them are different). The functions in ZFC given by sets of ordered pairs correspond to what PM call "matrices", and the more general functions in PM are coded by quantifying over some variables. In particular PM distinguishes between functions defined using quantification and functions not defined using quantification, whereas ZFC does not make this distinction.
- PM has no analogue of the axiom of replacement, though this is of little practical importance as this axiom is used very little in mathematics outside set theory.
- PM emphasizes relations as a fundamental concept, whereas in modern mathematical practice it is functions rather than relations that are treated as more fundamental; for example, category theory emphasizes morphisms or functions rather than relations. (However, there is an analogue of categories called allegories that models relations rather than functions, and is quite similar to the type system of PM.)
- In PM, cardinals are defined as classes of similar classes, whereas in ZFC cardinals are special ordinals. In PM there is a different collection of cardinals for each type with some complicated machinery for moving cardinals between types, whereas in ZFC there is only 1 sort of cardinal. Since PM does not have any equivalent of the axiom of replacement, it is unable to prove the existence of cardinals greater than ℵ_{ω}.
- In PM ordinals are treated as equivalence classes of well-ordered sets, and as with cardinals there is a different collection of ordinals for each type. In ZFC there is only one collection of ordinals, usually defined as von Neumann ordinals. One strange quirk of PM is that they do not have an ordinal corresponding to 1, which causes numerous unnecessary complications in their theorems. The definition of ordinal exponentiation α^{β} in PM is not equivalent to the usual definition in ZFC and has some rather undesirable properties: for example, it is not continuous in β and is not well ordered (so is not even an ordinal).
- The constructions of the integers, rationals and real numbers in ZFC have been streamlined considerably over time since the constructions in PM.

== Differences between editions ==
Apart from corrections of misprints, the main text of PM is unchanged between the first and second editions. The main text in Volumes 1 and 2 was reset, so that it occupies fewer pages in each. In the second edition, Volume 3 was not reset, being photographically reprinted with the same page numbering; corrections were still made. The total number of pages (excluding the endpapers) in the first edition is 1,996; in the second, 2,000. Volume 1 has five new additions:

- A 54-page introduction by Russell describing the changes they would have made had they had more time and energy. The main change he suggests is the removal of the controversial axiom of reducibility, though he admits that he knows no satisfactory substitute for it. He also seems more favourable to the idea that a function should be determined by its values (as is usual in modern mathematical practice).
- Appendix A, numbered as *8, 15 pages, about the Sheffer stroke.
- Appendix B, numbered as *89, discussing induction without the axiom of reducibility.
- Appendix C, 8 pages, discussing propositional functions.
- An 8-page list of definitions at the end, giving a much-needed index to the 500 or so notations used.

In 1962, Cambridge University Press published a shortened paperback edition containing parts of the second edition of Volume 1: the new introduction (and the old), the main text up to *56, and Appendices A and C..

== Legacy ==
Andrew D. Irvine says that PM sparked interest in symbolic logic and advanced the subject by popularizing it; it showcased the powers and capacities of symbolic logic; and it showed how advances in philosophy of mathematics and symbolic logic could go hand-in-hand with tremendous fruitfulness. PM was in part brought about by an interest in logicism, the view on which all mathematical truths are logical truths. Though flawed, PM would be influential in several later advances in meta-logic, including Gödel's incompleteness theorems.

The logical notation in PM was not widely adopted, possibly because its foundations are often considered a form of Zermelo–Fraenkel set theory.

Scholarly, historical, and philosophical interest in PM is great and ongoing, and mathematicians continue to work with PM, whether for the historical reason of understanding the text or its authors, or for furthering insight into the formalizations of math and logic.

The Modern Library placed PM 23rd in their list of the top 100 English-language nonfiction books of the 20th century.

== See also ==
- Axiomatic set theory
- Boolean algebra
- Information Processing Language – first computational demonstration of theorems in PM
- Introduction to Mathematical Philosophy

== Bibliography ==
- Enderton, Herbert B. (2001) [1972]. A Mathematical Introduction to Logic (2nd ed.). San Diego, California: Academic Press. ISBN 0-12-238452-0.
- Gödel, Kurt (1944). "Russell's Mathematical Logic". In Schilpp, Paul Arthur (ed.). The Philosophy of Bertrand Russell. The Library of Living Philosophers. Vol. 5 (1st ed.). Chicago: Northwestern University Press. pp. 123–153. LCCN 44006786. OCLC 2007378. OL 6467049M.
- Gödel, Kurt (1990). Feferman, Solomon; et al. (eds.). Collected Works, Volume II, Publications 1938–1974. New York: Oxford University Press. ISBN 0-19-503972-6.
- Grattan-Guinness, Ivor (2000). The Search for Mathematical Roots 1870–1940. Princeton, New Jersey: Princeton University Press. ISBN 0-691-05857-1.
- Hardy, G. H. (2004) [1940]. A Mathematician's Apology. Cambridge: Cambridge University Press. ISBN 978-0-521-42706-7.
- Kleene, Stephen Cole (1952). Introduction to Metamathematics (6th reprint ed.). Amsterdam, New York: North-Holland Publishing Company. LCCN 53001848. OCLC 9296141.
- Littlewood, J. E. (1986). Bollobás, Béla (ed.). Littlewood's Miscellany. Cambridge: Cambridge University Press. ISBN 0-521-33058-0. MR 0872858.
- van Heijenoort, Jean (1967). From Frege to Gödel: A Source book in Mathematical Logic, 1879–1931 (3rd printing ed.). Cambridge, Massachusetts: Harvard University Press. ISBN 0-674-32449-8.
- Weber, Michel; Desmond, William Jr., eds. (2008). Handbook of Whiteheadian Process Thought, Volume 1. Heusenstamm: Ontos Verlag. ISBN 978-3-938793-92-3 – via Academia.edu.
- Wittgenstein, Ludwig (2009). Major Works: Selected Philosophical Writings. New York: HarperCollins. ISBN 978-0-06-155024-9.

=== Editions ===
- Whitehead, Alfred North; Russell, Bertrand (1910). Principia Mathematica. Vol. 1 (1st ed.). Cambridge: Cambridge University Press. hdl:2027/miun.aat3201.0001.001. JFM 41.0083.02. LCCN a11002789.
- ——————————; ———————— (1912). Principia Mathematica. Vol. 2 (1st ed.). Cambridge: Cambridge University Press. hdl:2027/miun.aat3201.0002.001. JFM 43.0093.03. LCCN a11002789.
- ——————————; ———————— (1913). Principia Mathematica. Vol. 3 (1st ed.). Cambridge: Cambridge University Press. hdl:2027/miun.aat3201.0003.001. JFM 44.0068.01. LCCN a11002789.
- ——————————; ———————— (1978) [1925]. Principia Mathematica. Vol. 1 (2nd ed.). Cambridge: Cambridge University Press. hdl:loc.rbc/General.15133v1.1. ISBN 978-0-521-06791-1. JFM 51.0046.06. LCCN 25015133.
- ——————————; ———————— (1978) [1927]. Principia Mathematica. Vol. 2 (2nd ed.). Cambridge: Cambridge University Press. hdl:loc.rbc/General.15133v2.1. ISBN 978-0-521-06791-1. JFM 53.0038.02. LCCN 25015133.
- ——————————; ———————— (1978) [1927]. Principia Mathematica. Vol. 3 (2nd ed.). Cambridge: Cambridge University Press. hdl:loc.rbc/General.15133v3.1. ISBN 978-0-521-06791-1. JFM 53.0038.02. LCCN 25015133.
- ——————————; ———————— (1997) [1962]. Principia Mathematica to ✱56. Cambridge Mathematical Library (abridged ed.). Cambridge: Cambridge University Press. doi:10.1017/CBO9780511623585. ISBN 978-0-521-62606-4. MR 1700771. Zbl 0877.01042.

The first edition was reprinted in 2009 by Merchant Books, ISBN 978-1-60386-182-3, ISBN 978-1-60386-183-0, ISBN 978-1-60386-184-7.
