= Z function =

Mathematical function useful for studying the Riemann zeta function

Z function in the complex plane, plotted with a variant of domain coloring.

Z function in the complex plane, zoomed out.

In mathematics, the Z function is a function used for studying the Riemann zeta function along the critical line where the argument is one-half. It is also called the Riemann–Siegel Z function, the Riemann–Siegel zeta function, the Hardy function, the Hardy Z function and the Hardy zeta function. It can be defined in terms of the Riemann–Siegel theta function and the Riemann zeta function by

$$Z(t) = e^{i \theta(t)} \zeta(\tfrac{1}{2} + it).$$

It follows from the functional equation of the Riemann zeta function that the Z function is real for real values of $t$. It is an even function, and real analytic for real values. It follows from the fact that the Riemann–Siegel theta function and the Riemann zeta function are both holomorphic in the critical strip, where the imaginary part of t is between −1/2 and 1/2, that the Z function is holomorphic in the critical strip also. Moreover, the real zeros of $Z(t)$ are precisely the zeros of the zeta function along the critical line, and complex zeros in the Z function critical strip correspond to zeros off the critical line of the Riemann zeta function in its critical strip.

== The Riemann–Siegel formula ==
Calculation of the value of $Z(t)$ for real $t$, and hence of the zeta function along the critical line, is greatly expedited by the Riemann–Siegel formula. This formula tells us

$$Z(t) = 2 \sum_{n^2 < t/2\pi} n^{-1/2}\cos(\theta(t)-t \log n) +R(t),$$

where the error term $R(t)$ has a complex asymptotic expression in terms of the function

$$\Psi(z) = \frac{\cos 2\pi(z^2-z-1/16)}{\cos 2\pi z}$$

and its derivatives. If $u = (\tfrac t {2\pi})^{1/4}$, $N=\lfloor u^2 \rfloor$ and $p = u^2 - N$ then

$$R(t) \sim (-1)^{N-1}
\left( \Psi(p)u^{-1} - \frac{1}{96 \pi^2}\Psi^{(3)}(p)u^{-3} + \cdots\right)$$

where the ellipsis indicates we may continue on to higher and increasingly complex terms.

Other efficient series for Z(t) are known, in particular several using the incomplete gamma function. If

$$Q(a, z) = \frac{\Gamma(a,z)}{\Gamma(a)} = \frac 1 {\Gamma(a)} \int_z^\infty u^{a-1} e^{-u} \, du,$$

then an especially nice example is

$$Z(t) =2 \Re \left(e^{i \theta(t)} \left(\sum_{n=1}^\infty  Q\left(\frac{s}{2},\pi i n^2 \right) - \frac{\pi^{s/2} e^{\pi i s/4}} {s \Gamma\left(\frac{s}{2}\right)} \right) \right).$$

== Behavior of the Z function ==
From the critical line theorem, it follows that the density of the real zeros of the Z function is

$$\frac{c}{2\pi} \log \frac{t}{2\pi}$$

for some constant $c > 5/12$. Hence, the number of zeros in an interval of a given size slowly increases. If the Riemann hypothesis is true, all of the zeros in the critical strip are real zeros, and the constant c is one. It is also postulated that all of these zeros are simple zeros.

=== An Omega theorem ===
Because of the zeros of the Z function, it exhibits oscillatory behavior. It also slowly grows both on average and in peak value. For instance, we have, even without the Riemann hypothesis, the Omega theorem that

$$Z(t) = \Omega\left( \exp\left(\frac{3}{4}\sqrt{\frac{\log t}{\log \log t}}\right)
\right),$$

where the notation means that $Z(t)$ divided by the function within the Ω does not tend to zero with increasing t.

=== Average growth ===
The average growth of the Z function has also been much studied. We can find the root mean square (abbreviated RMS) average from

$$\frac{1}{T} \int_0^T Z(t)^2 dt \sim \log T$$

or

$$\frac{1}{T} \int_T^{2T} Z(t)^2 dt \sim \log T$$

which tell us that the RMS size of Z(t) grows as $\sqrt{\log t}$.

This estimate can be improved to

$$\frac{1}{T} \int_0^T Z(t)^2 dt = \log T + (2\gamma - 2 \log(2 \pi) -1) + O(T^{-15/22})$$

If we increase the exponent, we get an average value which depends more on the peak values of Z. For fourth powers, we have

$$\frac{1}{T} \int_0^T Z(t)^4 dt \sim \frac{1}{2\pi^2}(\log T)^4$$

from which we may conclude that the fourth root of the mean fourth power grows as $\tfrac{1}{2^{1/4} \sqrt{\pi}} \log t.$

=== The Lindelöf hypothesis ===
Higher even powers have been much studied, but less is known about the corresponding average value. It is conjectured, and follows from the Riemann hypothesis, that

$$\frac{1}{T} \int_0^T Z(t)^{2k} \, dt = o(T^\varepsilon)$$

for every positive ε. Here the little "o" notation means that the left hand side divided by the right hand side does converge to zero; in other words little o is the negation of Ω. This conjecture is called the Lindelöf hypothesis, and is weaker than the Riemann hypothesis. It is normally stated in an important equivalent form, which is

$$Z(t) = o(t^\varepsilon);$$

in either form it tells us the rate of growth of the peak values cannot be too high. The best known bound on this rate of growth is not strong, telling us that any $\epsilon > \tfrac{89}{570}\approx 0.156$ is suitable. It would be astonishing to find that the Z function grew anywhere close to as fast as this. Littlewood proved that on the Riemann hypothesis,

$$Z(t) = o\left(\exp\left(\frac{10 \log t}{\log \log t}\right)\right),$$

and this seems far more likely.
