= Axiom of reducibility =

Axiom in Russell's ramified theory of types

The axiom of reducibility was introduced by Bertrand Russell in the early 20th century as part of his ramified theory of types. Russell devised and introduced the axiom in an attempt to manage the contradictions he had discovered in his analysis of set theory.

== History ==
With Russell's discovery (1901, 1902) of a paradox in Gottlob Frege's 1893 Grundgesetze der Arithmetik and Frege's acknowledgment of the same (1902), Russell tentatively introduced his solution as "Appendix B: Doctrine of Types" in his 1903 The Principles of Mathematics. This contradiction can be stated as "the class of all classes that do not contain themselves as elements". At the end of this appendix Russell asserts that his "doctrine" would solve the immediate problem posed by Frege, but "there is at least one closely analogous contradiction which is probably not soluble by this doctrine. The totality of all logical objects, or of all propositions, involves, it would seem a fundamental logical difficulty. What the complete solution of the difficulty may be, I have not succeeded in discovering; but as it affects the very foundations of reasoning..."

By the time of his 1908 Mathematical logic as based on the theory of types Russell had studied "the contradictions" (among them the Epimenides paradox, the Burali-Forti paradox, and Richard's paradox) and concluded that "In all the contradictions there is a common characteristic, which we may describe as self-reference or reflexiveness".

In 1903, Russell defined predicative functions as those whose order is one more than the highest-order function occurring in the expression of the function. While these were fine for the situation, impredicative functions had to be disallowed:

A function whose argument is an individual and whose value is always a first-order proposition will be called a first-order function. A function involving a first-order function or proposition as apparent variable will be called a second-order function, and so on. A function of one variable which is of the order next above that of its argument will be called a predicative function; the same name will be given to a function of several variables [etc].

He repeats this definition in a slightly different way later in the paper (together with a subtle prohibition that they would express more clearly in 1913):

A predicative function of x is one whose values are propositions of the type next above that of x, if x is an individual or a proposition, or that of values of x if x is a function. It may be described as one in which the apparent variables, if any, are all of the same type as x or of lower type; and a variable is of lower type than x if it can significantly occur as argument to x, or as argument to an argument to x, and so forth. [emphasis added]

This usage carries over to Alfred North Whitehead and Russell's 1913 Principia Mathematica wherein the authors devote an entire subsection of their Chapter II: "The Theory of Logical Types" to subchapter I. The Vicious-Circle Principle: "We will define a function of one variable as predicative when it is of the next order above that of its argument, i.e. of the lowest order compatible with its having that argument. . . A function of several arguments is predicative if there is one of its arguments such that, when the other arguments have values assigned to them, we obtain a predicative function of the one undetermined argument."

They again propose the definition of a predicative function as one that does not violate The Theory of Logical Types. Indeed the authors assert such violations are "incapable [to achieve]" and "impossible":

We are thus led to the conclusion, both from the vicious-circle principle and from direct inspection, that the functions to which a given object a can be an argument are incapable of being arguments to each other, and that they have no term in common with the functions to which they can be arguments. We are thus led to construct a hierarchy.

The authors stress the word impossible:

if we are not mistaken, that not only is it impossible for a function φz^{^} to have itself or anything derived from it as argument, but that, if ψz^{^} is another function such there are arguments a with which both "φa" and "ψa" are significant, then ψz^{^} and anything derived from it cannot significantly be argument to φz^{^}.

== Russell's axiom of reducibility ==
The axiom of reducibility states that any truth function (i.e. propositional function) can be expressed by a formally equivalent predicative truth function. It made its first appearance in Bertrand Russell's (1908) Mathematical logic as based on the theory of types, but only after some five years of trial and error. In his words:

Thus a predicative function of an individual is a first-order function; and for higher types of arguments, predicative functions take the place that first-order functions take in respect of individuals. We assume then, that every function is equivalent, for all its values, to some predicative function of the same argument. This assumption seems to be the essence of the usual assumption of classes [modern sets] . . . we will call this assumption the axiom of classes, or the axiom of reducibility.

For relations (functions of two variables such as "For all x and for all y, those values for which f(x,y) is true" i.e. ∀x∀y: f(x,y)), Russell assumed an axiom of relations, or [the same] axiom of reducibility.

In 1903, he proposed a possible process of evaluating such a 2-place function by comparing the process to double integration: One after another, plug into x definite values a_{m} (i.e. the particular a_{j} is "a constant" or a parameter held constant), then evaluate f(a_{m},y_{n}) across all the n instances of possible y_{n}. For all y_{n} evaluate f(a_{1}, y_{n}), then for all y_{n} evaluate f(a_{2}, y_{n}), etc until all the x = a_{m} are exhausted). This would create an m by n matrix of values: TRUE or UNKNOWN. (In this exposition, the use of indices is a modern convenience.)

In 1908, Russell made no mention of this matrix of x, y values that render a two-place function (e.g. relation) TRUE, but by 1913 he has introduced a matrix-like concept into "function". In *12 of Principia Mathematica (1913) he defines "a matrix" as "any function, of however many variables, which does not involve any apparent variables. Then any possible function other than a matrix is derived from a matrix by means of generalisation, i.e. by considering the proposition which asserts that the function in question is true with all possible values or with some values of one of the arguments, the other argument or arguments remaining undetermined". For example, if one asserts that "∀y: f(x, y) is true", then x is the apparent variable because it is unspecified.

Russell now defines a matrix of "individuals" as a first-order matrix, and he follows a similar process to define a second-order matrix, etc. Finally, he introduces the definition of a predicative function:

A function is said to be predicative when it is a matrix. It will be observed that, in a hierarchy in which all the variables are individuals or matrices, a matrix is the same thing as an elementary function [cf. 1913:127, meaning: the function contains no apparent variables]. ¶ "Matrix" or "predicative function" is a primitive idea.

From this reasoning, he then uses the same wording to propose the same axioms of reducibility as he did in his 1908.

As an aside, Russell in his 1903 considered, and then rejected, "a temptation to regard a relation as definable in extension as a class of couples", i.e. the modern set-theoretic notion of ordered pair. An intuitive version of this notion appeared in Frege's (1879) Begriffsschrift (translated in van Heijenoort 1967:23); Russell's 1903 followed closely the work of Frege (cf. Russell 1903:505ff). Russell worried that "it is necessary to give sense to the couple, to distinguish the referent from the relatum: thus a couple becomes essentially distinct from a class of two terms, and must itself be introduced as a primitive idea. It would seem, viewing the idea philosophically, that sense can only be derived from some relational proposition . . . it seems therefore more correct to take an intensional view of relations, and to identify them rather with class-concepts than with classes". As shown below, Norbert Wiener (1914) reduced the notion of relation to class by his definition of an ordered pair.

== Criticism ==
=== Zermelo 1908 ===
The outright prohibition implied by Russell's axiom of reducibility was roundly criticised by Ernst Zermelo in his 1908 Investigations in the foundations of set theory I, stung as he was by a demand similar to that of Russell that came from Poincaré:

According to Poincaré (1906, p. 307) a definition is "predicative" and logically admissible only if it excludes all objects that are "dependent" upon the notion defined, that is, that can in any way be determined by it.

Zermelo countered:

A definition may very well rely upon notions that are equivalent to the one being defined; indeed in every definition definiens and definiendum are equivalent notions, and the strict observance of Poincaré's demand would make every definition, hence all of science, impossible.

=== Wiener 1914 ===
In his 1914 A simplification of the logic of relations, Norbert Wiener removed the need for the axiom of reducibility as applied to relations between two variables x, and y e.g. φ(x,y). He did this by introducing a way to express a relation as a set of ordered pairs: "It will be seen that what we have done is practically to revert to Schröder's treatment of a relation as a class [set] of ordered couples". Van Heijenoort observes that "[b]y giving a definition of the ordered pair of two-elements in terms of class operations, the note reduced the theory of relations to that of classes." But Wiener opined that while he had dispatched Russell and Whitehead's two-variable version of the axiom *12.11, the single-variable version of the axiom of reducibility for (axiom *12.1 in Principia Mathematica) was still necessary.

=== Wittgenstein 1918 ===
Ludwig Wittgenstein, while imprisoned in a prison camp, finished his Tractatus Logico-Philosophicus. His introduction credits "the great works of Frege and the writings of my friend Bertrand Russell". Not a self-effacing intellectual, he pronounced that "the truth of the thoughts communicated here seems to me unassailable and definitive. I am, therefore, of the opinion that the problems have in essentials been finally solved." So given such an attitude, it is no surprise that Russell's theory of types comes under criticism:

3.33

In logical syntax the meaning of a sign ought never to play a role; it must admit of being established without mention being thereby made of the meaning of a sign; it ought to presuppose only the description of the expressions.

3.331

From this observation we get a further view – into Russell's Theory of Types. Russell's error is shown by the fact that in drawing up his symbolic rules he has to speak of the meaning of the signs.

3.332

No proposition can say anything about itself, because the proposition sign cannot be contained in itself (that is the "whole theory of types").

3.333

A function cannot be its own argument, because the functional sign already contains the prototype of its own argument and it cannot contain itself. ... Herewith Russell's paradox vanishes.

This appears to support the same argument Russell uses to erase his "paradox". This "using the signs" to "speak of the signs" Russell criticises in his introduction that preceded the original English translation:

What causes hesitation is the fact that, after all, Mr Wittgenstein manages to say a good deal about what cannot be said, thus suggesting to the sceptical reader that possibly there may be some loophole through a hierarchy of languages, or by some other exit.

This problem appears later when Wittgenstein arrives at this gentle disavowal of the axiom of reducibility—one interpretation of the following is that Wittgenstein is saying that Russell has made (what is known today as) a category error; Russell has asserted (inserted into the theory) a "further law of logic" when all the laws (e.g. the unbounded Sheffer stroke adopted by Wittgenstein) have already been asserted:

6.123

It is clear that the laws of logic cannot themselves obey further logical laws. (There is not, as Russell supposed, for every "type" a special law of contradiction; but one is sufficient, since it is not applied to itself.)

6.1231

The mark of logical propositions is not their general validity. To be general is only to be accidentally valid for all things. An ungeneralised proposition can be tautologous just as well as a generalised one.

6.1232

Logical general validity, we could call essential as opposed to accidental general validity, e.g., of the proposition "all men are mortal". Propositions like Russell's "axiom of reducibility" are not logical propositions, and this explains our feeling that, if true, they can only be true by a happy chance.

6.1233

We can imagine a world in which the axiom of reducibility is not valid. But it is clear that logic has nothing to do with the question of whether our world is really of this kind or not.

=== Russell 1919 ===
Bertrand Russell in his 1919 Introduction to Mathematical Philosophy, a non-mathematical companion to his first edition of PM, discusses his Axiom of Reducibility in Chapter 17 Classes (pp. 146ff). He concludes that "we cannot accept "class" as a primitive idea; the symbols for classes are "mere conveniences" and classes are "logical fictions, or (as we say) 'incomplete symbols' ... classes cannot be regarded as part of the ultimate furniture of the world" (p. 146). The reason for this is because of the problem of impredicativity: "classes cannot be regarded as a species of individuals, on account of the contradiction about classes which are not members of themselves ... and because we can prove that the number of classes is greater than the number of individuals, [etc]". What he then does is propose 5 obligations that must be satisfied with respect to a theory of classes, and the result is his axiom of reducibility. He states that this axiom is "a generalised form of Leibniz's identity of indiscernibles" (p. 155). But he concludes Leibniz's assumption is not necessarily true for all possible predicates in all possible worlds, so he concludes that:

I do not see any reason to believe that the axiom of reducibility is logically necessary, which is what would be meant by saying that it is true in all possible worlds. The admission of this axiom into a system of logic is therefore a defect ... a dubious assumption. (p. 155)

The goal that he sets for himself then is "adjustments to his theory" of avoiding classes:

in its reduction of propositions nominally about classes to propositions about their defining functions. The avoidance of classes as entities by this method must, it would be seem, be sound in principle, however the detail may still require adjustment. (p. 155)

=== Skolem 1922 ===
Thoralf Skolem in his 1922 Some remarks on axiomatised set theory took a less than positive attitude toward "Russell and Whitehead" (i.e. their work Principia Mathematica):

Until now, so far as I know, only one such system of axioms has found rather general acceptance, namely that constructed by Zermelo (1908). Russell and Whitehead, too, constructed a system of logic that provides a foundation for set theory; if I am not mistaken, however, mathematicians have taken but little interest in it.

Skolem then observes the problems of what he called "nonpredicative definition" in the set theory of Zermelo:

the difficulty is that we have to form some sets whose existence depends upon all sets ... Poincaré called this kind of definition and regarded it as the real logical weakness of set theory.

While Skolem is mainly addressing a problem with Zermelo's set theory, he does make this observation about the axiom of reducibility:

they [Russell and Whitehead], too, simply content themselves with circumventing the difficulty by introducing a stipulation, the axiom of reducibility. Actually, this axiom decrees that the nonpredicative stipulations will be satisfied. There is no proof of that; besides, so far as I can see, such a proof must be impossible from Russell and Whitehead's point of view as well as from Zermelo's. [emphasis added]

=== Russell 1927 ===
In his 1927 "Introduction" to the second edition of Principia Mathematica, Russell criticises his own axiom:

One point in regard to which improvement is obviously desirable is the axiom of reducibility (*12.1.11). This axiom has a purely pragmatic justification: it leads to the desired results, and to no others. But clearly it is not the sort of axiom with which we can rest content. On this subject, however, it cannot be said that a satisfactory solution is as yet obtainable. ... There is another course recommended by Wittgenstein† [† Tractatus Logico-Philosophicus, *5.54ff] for philosophical reasons. This is to assume that functions of propositions are always truth-functions, and that a function can only occur as in a proposition through its values. There are difficulties ... It involves the consequence that all functions of functions are extensional. ... [But the consequences of his logic are that] the theory of infinite Dedekindian and well-ordering collapses, so that irrationals, and real numbers generally, can no longer be adequately dealt with. Also Cantor's proof that 2^{n} > n breaks down unless n is finite. Perhaps some further axiom, less objectionable than the axiom of reducibility, might give these results, but we have not succeeded in finding such an axiom.

Wittgenstein's 5.54ff is more centred on the notion of function:

5.54

In the general propositional form, propositions occur in a proposition only as bases of the truth-operations.

5.541

At first sight it appears as if there were also a different way in which one proposition could occur in another. ¶ Especially in certain propositional forms of psychology, like "A thinks, that p is the case," or "A thinks p," etc. ¶ Here it appears superficially as if the proposition p stood to the object A in a kind of relation. ¶ (And in modern epistemology [Russell, Moore, etc.] those propositions have been conceived in this way.)

5.542

But it is clear that "A believes that p, "A thinks p", "A says p", are of the form " ' p ' thinks p "; and here we have no co-ordination of a fact and an object, but a co-ordination of facts by means of a co-ordination of their objects.

5.5421 [etc: "A composite soul would not be a soul any longer."] 5.5422

The correct explanation of the form of the proposition "A judges p" must show that it is impossible to judge a nonsense. (Russell's theory does not satisfy this condition).

A possible interpretation of Wittgenstein's stance is that the thinker A i.e. 'p' is identically the thought p, in this way the "soul" remains a unit and not a composite. So to utter "the thought thinks the thought" is nonsense, because per 5.542 the utterance does not specify anything.

=== von Neumann 1925 ===
John von Neumann in his 1925 "An axiomatisation of set theory" wrestled with the same issues as did Russell, Zermelo, Skolem, and Fraenkel. He summarily rejected the effort of Russell:

Here Russell, J. Konig, Weyl, and Brouwer must be mentioned. They arrived at entirely different results [from the set theorists], but the over-all effect of their activity seems to me outright devastating. In Russell, all of mathematics and set theory seems to rest upon the highly problematic "axiom of reducibility", while Weyl and Brouwer systematically reject the larger part of mathematics and set theory as completely meaningless.

He then notes the work of the set theorists Zermelo, Fraenkel and Schoenflies, in which "one understands by "set" nothing but an object of which one knows no more and wants to know no more than what follows about it from the postulates. The postulates [of set theory] are to be formulated in such a way that all the desired theorems of Cantor's set theory follow from them, but not the antinomies.

While he mentions the efforts of David Hilbert to prove the consistency of his axiomatisation of mathematics von Neumann placed him in the same group as Russell. Rather, von Neumann considered his proposal to be "in the spirit of the second group ... We must, however, avoid forming sets by collecting or separating elements [durch Zusammenfassung oder Aussonderung von Elementen], and so on, as well as eschew the unclear principle of 'definiteness' that can still be found in Zermelo. [...] We prefer, however, to axiomatise not 'set' but 'function'."

Van Heijenoort observes that ultimately this axiomatic system of von Neumann's, "was simplified, revised, and expanded ... and it come to be known as the von Neumann-Bernays-Gödel set theory."

=== David Hilbert 1927 ===
David Hilbert's axiomatic system that he presents in his 1925 The Foundations of Mathematics is the mature expression of a task he set about in the early 1900s but let lapse for a while (cf. his 1904 On the foundations of logic and arithmetic). His system is neither set theoretic nor derived directly from Russell and Whitehead. Rather, it invokes 13 axioms of logic—four axioms of Implication, six axioms of logical AND and logical OR, 2 axioms of logical negation, and 1 ε-axiom ("existence" axiom)-- plus a version of the Peano axioms in 4 axioms including mathematical induction, some definitions that "have the character of axioms, and certain recursion axioms that result from a general recursion schema" plus some formation rules that "govern the use of the axioms".

Hilbert states that, with regard to this system, i.e. "Russell and Whitehead's theory of foundations[,] ... the foundation that it provides for mathematics rests, first, upon the axiom of infinity and, then upon what is called the axiom of reducibility, and both of these axioms are genuine contentual assumptions that are not supported by a consistency proof; they are assumptions whose validity in fact remains dubious and that, in any case, my theory does not require ... reducibility is not presupposed in my theory ... the execution of the reduction would be required only in case a proof of a contradiction were given, and then, according to my proof theory, this reduction would always be bound to succeed."

It is upon this foundation that modern recursion theory rests.

=== Ramsey 1925 ===
In 1925, Frank Plumpton Ramsey argued that it is not needed. However in the second edition of Principia Mathematica (1927, page xiv) and in Ramsey's 1926 paper it is stated that certain theorems about real numbers could not be proved using Ramsey's approach. Most later mathematical formalisms (Hilbert's Formalism or Brower's Intuitionism for example) do not use it.

Ramsey showed that it is possible to reformulate the definition of predicative by using the definitions in Wittgenstein's Tractatus Logico-Philosophicus. As a result, all functions of a given order are predicative, irrespective of how they are expressed. He goes on to show that his formulation still avoids the paradoxes. However, the "Tractatus" theory did not appear strong enough to prove some mathematical results.

=== Gödel 1944 ===
Kurt Gödel in his 1944 Russell's mathematical logic offers in the words of his commentator Charles Parsons, "[what] might be seen as a defense of these [realist] attitudes of Russell against the reductionism prominent in his philosophy and implicit in much of his actual logical work. It was perhaps the most robust defense of realism about mathematics and its objects since the paradoxes and come to the consciousness of the mathematical world after 1900".

In general, Gödel is sympathetic to the notion that a propositional function can be reduced to (identified with) the real objects that satisfy it, but this causes problems with respect to the theory of real numbers, and even integers (p. 134). He observes that the first edition of PM "abandoned" the realist (constructivistic) "attitude" with his proposal of the axiom of reducibility (p. 133). However, within the introduction to the second edition of PM (1927) Gödel asserts "the constructivistic attitude is resumed again" (p. 133) when Russell "dropped" of the axiom of reducibility in favour of the matrix (truth-functional) theory; Russell "stated explicitly that all primitive predicates belong to the lowest type and that the only purpose of variables (and evidently also of constants) is to make it possible to assert more complicated truth-functions of atomic propositions ... [i.e.] the higher types and orders are solely a façon de parler" (p. 134). But this only works when the number of individuals and primitive predicates is finite, for one can construct finite strings of symbols such as:

$x = a_1 \vee x = a_2 \vee \dots \vee x = a_k$ [example on page 134]

And from such strings one can form strings of strings to obtain the equivalent of classes of classes, with a mixture of types possible. However, from such finite strings the whole of mathematics cannot be constructed because they cannot be "analyzed", i.e. reducible to the law of identity or disprovable by a negations of the law:

Even the theory of integers is non-analytic, provided that one requires of the rules of elimination that they allow one actually to carry out the elimination in a finite number of steps in each case.^{44} (^{44}Because this would imply the existence of a decision procedure for all arithmetical propositions. Cf. Turing 1937.) ... [Thus] the whole of mathematics as applied to sentences of infinite length has to be presupposed to prove [the] analyticity [of the theory of integers], e.g., the axiom of choice can be proved to be analytic only if it is assumed to be true. (p. 139)

But he observes that "this procedure seems to presuppose arithmetic in some form or other" (p. 134), and he states in the next paragraph that "the question of whether (or to what extent) the theory of integers can be obtained on the basis of the ramified hierarchy must be considered as unsolved." (p. 135)

Gödel proposed that one should take a "more conservative approach":

make the meaning of the terms "class" and "concept" clearer, and to set up a consistent theory of classes and concepts as objectively existing entities. This is the course which the actual development of mathematical logic has been taking ... Major among the attempts in this direction ... are the simple theory of types ... and axiomatic set theory, both of which have been successful at least to this extent, that they permit the derivation of modern mathematics and at the same time avoid all known paradoxes. Many symptoms show only too clearly, however, that the primitive concepts need further elucidation. (p. 140)

=== Quine 1967 ===
In a critique that also discusses the pros and cons of Ramsey (1931) W. V. O. Quine calls Russell's formulation of "types" to be "troublesome ... the confusion persists as he attempts to define 'nth order propositions'... the method is indeed oddly devious ... the axiom of reducibility is self-effacing", etc.

Like Stephen Kleene, Quine observes that Ramsey (1926) divided the various paradoxes into two varieties (i) "those of pure set theory" and (ii) those derived from "semantic concepts such as falsity and specifiability", and Ramsey believed that the second variety should have been left out of Russell's solution. Quine ends with the opinion that "because of the confusion of propositions with sentences, and of attributes with their expressions, Russell's purported solution of the semantic paradoxes was enigmatic anyway."

=== Kleene 1952 ===
In his section "§12. First inferences from the paradoxes" (subchapter "LOGICISM"), Stephen Kleene (1952) traces the development of Russell's theory of types:

To adapt the logicistic [sic] construction of mathematics to the situation arising from the discovery of the paradoxes, Russell excluded impredicative definitions by his ramified theory of types (1908, 1910).

Kleene observes that "to exclude impredicative definitions within a type, the types above type 0 [primary objects or individuals "not subjected to logical analysis"] are further separated into orders. Thus for type 1 [properties of individuals, i.e. logical results of the propositional calculus ], properties defined without mentioning any totality belong to order 0, and properties defined using the totality of properties of a given order below to the next higher order)".

Kleene, however, parenthetically observes that "the logicistic definition of natural number now becomes predicative when the [property] P in it is specified to range only over properties of a given order; in [this] case the property of being a natural number is of the next higher order". But this separation into orders makes it impossible to construct the familiar analysis, which [see Kleene's example at Impredicativity] contains impredicative definitions. To escape this outcome, Russell postulated his axiom of reducibility. But, Kleene wonders, "on what grounds should we believe in the axiom of reducibility?" He observes that, whereas Principia Mathematica is presented as derived from intuitively-derived axioms that "were intended to be believed about the world, or at least to be accepted as plausible hypotheses concerning the world[,] ... if properties are to be constructed, the matter should be settled on the basis of constructions, not by an axiom." Indeed, he quotes Whitehead and Russell (1927) questioning their own axiom: "clearly it is not the sort of axiom with which we can rest content".

Kleene references the work of Ramsey 1926, but notes that "neither Whitehead and Russell nor Ramsey succeeded in attaining the logicistic goal constructively" and "an interesting proposal ... by Langford 1927 and Carnap 1931-2, is also not free of difficulties." Kleene ends this discussion with quotes from Weyl (1946) that "the system of Principia Mathematica ... [is founded on] a sort of logician's paradise" and anyone "who is ready to believe in this 'transcendental world' could also accept the system of axiomatic set theory (Zermelo, Fraenkel, etc), which, for the deduction of mathematics, has the advantage of being simpler in structure."
