= John Lomas (cricketer) =

English cricketer (1917–1945)

Personal information
- Full name: John Millington Lomas
- Born: 12 December 1917; Ashtead, Surrey, England
- Died: 4 December 1945 (aged 27); Pimlico, London, England
- Batting: Right-handed

Domestic team information
- Years: Team
- 1938 to 1939: Oxford University

Career statistics
Competition	First-class
Matches	23
Runs scored	1460
Batting average	34.76
100s/50s	2/10
Top score	138
Catches/stumpings	10/0
- Source: Cricinfo, 31 August 2019

John Millington Lomas (12 December 1917 – 4 December 1945) was an English cricketer who played first-class cricket for Oxford University in 1938 and 1939.

== Life and career ==
Lomas was an outstanding schoolboy cricketer at Charterhouse School. He captained the school team in 1936, leading them through the season unbeaten against other schools and inflicting Eton's first loss to another school since 1920. He was awarded a scholarship to Oxford University, where he won Blues for both cricket and football, and was secretary of both clubs.

An opening batsman and fine fieldsman, Lomas had an outstanding first season with Oxford in 1938, scoring 908 runs at an average of 45.40. Troubled by ill-health in 1939 he was less successful, but nevertheless made his highest score of 138 against a strong MCC side at Lord's.

When the Second World War began Lomas enlisted in the Royal Navy Volunteer Reserve, but was invalided out in 1940 owing to illness. For a time he worked at the Admiralty, but his health again failed him and he returned to his studies at Oxford. He completed his law degree in 1945 and was made a fellow of New College, Oxford. However, with his final bar exams approaching, Lomas gassed himself in December 1945. The cricket writer R. C. Robertson-Glasgow, an admirer of Lomas's batting, observed that "the current of his thought and ambitions ran deep out of the sight of common day and common intercourse".

He was a close friend of the mathematician G. H. Hardy, a cricket lover. Hardy dedicated A Mathematician's Apology (1940) to Lomas with an inscription explaining that Lomas had asked him to write the work.
