= A Course of Pure Mathematics =

Textbook by G. H. Hardy

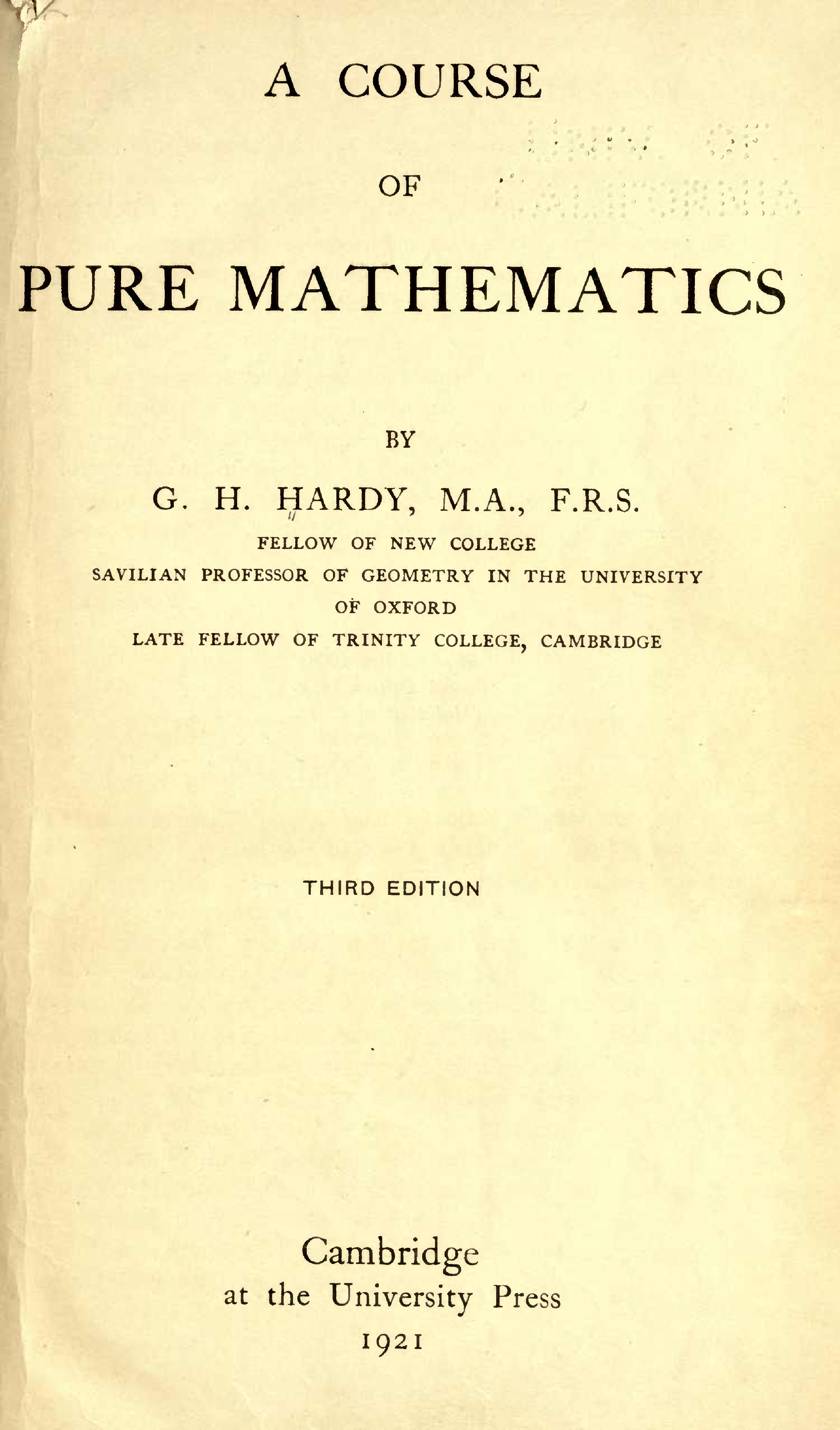
- Cover of Third edition, 1921
- Author: G. H. Hardy
- Language: English
- Subject: Mathematical Analysis
- Publisher: Cambridge University Press
- Publication date: 1908
- Publication place: England
- ISBN: 0521720559

A Course of Pure Mathematics is a classic textbook on introductory mathematical analysis, written by G. H. Hardy. It is recommended for people studying calculus. First published in 1908, it went through ten editions (up to 1952) and several reprints. It is now out of copyright in UK and is downloadable from various Internet websites. It remains one of the most popular books on pure mathematics.

== Contents ==
The book contains a large number of descriptive and study materials together with a number of difficult problems with regards to number theory analysis. The book is organized into the following chapters.

- I. REAL VARIABLES
- II. FUNCTIONS OF REAL VARIABLES
- III. COMPLEX NUMBERS
- IV. LIMITS OF FUNCTIONS OF A POSITIVE INTEGRAL VARIABLE
- V. LIMITS OF FUNCTIONS OF A CONTINUOUS VARIABLE. CONTINUOUS AND DISCONTINUOUS FUNCTIONS
- VI. DERIVATIVES AND INTEGRALS
- VII. ADDITIONAL THEOREMS IN THE DIFFERENTIAL AND INTEGRAL CALCULUS
- VIII. THE CONVERGENCE OF INFINITE SERIES AND INFINITE INTEGRALS
- IX. THE LOGARITHMIC, EXPONENTIAL AND CIRCULAR FUNCTIONS OF A REAL VARIABLE
- X. THE GENERAL THEORY OF THE LOGARITHMIC, EXPONENTIAL AND CIRCULAR FUNCTIONS

In his development of circular functions, Hardy diverges from other textbooks: He writes, that the usual presentation has the unproven assumption that "angles are capable of numerical measurement". (page 316) He notes that usually the approach is through length of an arc demarcated by the angle, but that calculation of the arc length is "decidedly more difficult" than calculation of area. He proceeds to calculate the area of the sector AOP of the unit circle, and defines the angle AOP to be twice that area. (page 317)

== Reviews ==
The book was intended to help reform mathematics teaching in the UK, and more specifically in the University of Cambridge and in schools preparing to study higher mathematics. It was aimed directly at "scholarship level" students – the top 10% to 20% by ability. Hardy himself did not originally find a passion for mathematics, only seeing it as a way to beat other students, which he did decisively, and gain scholarships.

The book has been reviewed by several authors.
