= Selberg's zeta function conjecture =

In mathematics, the Selberg conjecture, named after Atle Selberg, is a theorem about the density of zeros of the Riemann zeta function ζ(1/2 + it). It is known that the function has infinitely many zeroes on this line in the complex plane: the point at issue is how densely they are clustered. Results on this can be formulated in terms of N(T), the function counting zeroes on the line for which the value of t satisfies 0 ≤ t ≤ T.

== Background ==
In 1942 Atle Selberg investigated the problem of the Hardy–Littlewood conjecture 2; and he proved that for any $\varepsilon > 0$ there exist $T_0 = T_0(\varepsilon) > 0$ and $c = c(\varepsilon) > 0,$ such that for $T \geq T_0$ and $H=T^{0.5+\varepsilon}$ the inequality

$$N(T+H)-N(T) \geq cH\log T$$

holds true.

In his turn, Selberg stated a conjecture relating to shorter intervals, namely that it is possible to decrease the value of the exponent a = 0.5 in

$$H=T^{0.5+\varepsilon}.$$

== Proof of the conjecture ==
In 1984 Anatolii Karatsuba proved that for a fixed $\varepsilon$ satisfying the condition

$$0<\varepsilon < 0.001,$$

a sufficiently large T and

$H = T^{a+\varepsilon},$ $a = \tfrac{27}{82} = \tfrac{1}{3} -\tfrac{1}{246},$

the interval in the ordinate t (T, T + H) contains at least cH ln T real zeros of the Riemann zeta function

$$\zeta\Bigl(\tfrac{1}{2}+it\Bigr);$$

and thereby confirmed the Selberg conjecture. The estimates of Selberg and Karatsuba cannot be improved in respect of the order of growth as T → +∞.

== Further work ==
In 1992 Karatsuba proved that an analog of the Selberg conjecture holds for "almost all" intervals (T, T + H], H = T^{ε}, where ε is an arbitrarily small fixed positive number. The Karatsuba method permits one to investigate zeroes of the Riemann zeta function on "supershort" intervals of the critical line, that is, on the intervals (T, T + H], the length H of which grows slower than any, even arbitrarily small degree T.

In particular, he proved that for any given numbers ε, ε_{1} satisfying the conditions 0 < ε, ε_{1}< 1 almost all intervals (T, T + H] for H ≥ exp[(ln T)^{ε}] contain at least H (ln T)^{1 −ε_{1}} zeros of the function ζ(1/2 + it). This estimate is quite close to the conditional result that follows from the Riemann hypothesis.
