= Introduction to Mathematical Philosophy =

Book by Bertrand Russell

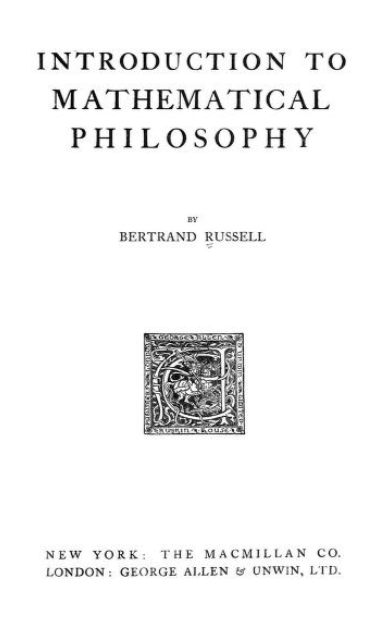
- Title page for Introduction to Mathematical Philosophy (1919)
- Author: Bertrand Russell
- Language: English
- Genre: Non-fictions
- Publisher: George Allen & Unwin
- Publication date: 1919

Introduction to Mathematical Philosophy is a book (1919 first edition) by philosopher Bertrand Russell, in which the author seeks to create an accessible introduction to various topics within the foundations of mathematics. According to the preface, the book is intended for those with only limited knowledge of mathematics and no prior experience with the mathematical logic it deals with. Accordingly, it is often used in introductory philosophy of mathematics courses at institutions of higher education.

== Background ==
Introduction to Mathematical Philosophy was written while Russell was serving time in Brixton Prison due to his anti-war activities.

== Contents ==
The book deals with a wide variety of topics within the philosophy of mathematics and mathematical logic including the logical basis and definition of natural numbers, real and complex numbers, limits and continuity, and classes.

== Editions ==
- Russell, Bertrand (1919), Introduction to Mathematical Philosophy, George Allen & Unwin. (Reprinted: Routledge, 1993.)
- Russell, Bertrand (1920), Introduction to Mathematical Philosophy, London: George Allen & Unwin / NY: Macmillan, Second Edition, reprintings 1920, 1924, 1930.

== See also ==
- Principia Mathematica
- The Principles of Mathematics
- Logicism
