= Hardy–Littlewood zeta function conjectures =

In mathematics, the Hardy–Littlewood zeta function conjectures, named after Godfrey Harold Hardy and John Edensor Littlewood, are two conjectures concerning the distances between zeros and the density of zeros of the Riemann zeta function.

== Conjectures ==
In 1914, Godfrey Harold Hardy proved that the Riemann zeta function $\zeta\bigl(\tfrac{1}{2}+it\bigr)$ has infinitely many real zeros.

Let $N(T)$ be the total number of real zeros, $N_0(T)$ be the total number of zeros of odd order of the function $\zeta\bigl(\tfrac{1}{2}+it\bigr)$, lying on the interval $(0,T]$.

Hardy and Littlewood claimed two conjectures. These conjectures – on the distance between real zeros of $\zeta\bigl(\tfrac{1}{2}+it\bigr)$ and on the density of zeros of $\zeta\bigl(\tfrac{1}{2}+it\bigr)$ on intervals $(T,T+H]$ for sufficiently great $T > 0$, $H = T^{a + \varepsilon}$ and with as less as possible value of $a > 0$, where $\varepsilon > 0$ is an arbitrarily small number – open two new directions in the investigation of the Riemann zeta function.

1. For any $\varepsilon > 0$ there exists such $T_0 = T_0(\varepsilon) > 0$ that for $T \geq T_0$ and $H=T^{0.25+\varepsilon}$ the interval $(T,T+H]$ contains a zero of odd order of the function $\zeta\bigl(\tfrac{1}{2}+it\bigr)$.

2. For any $\varepsilon > 0$ there exist $T_0 = T_0(\varepsilon) > 0$ and $c = c(\varepsilon) > 0$, such that for $T \geq T_0$ and $H=T^{0.5+\varepsilon}$ the inequality $N_0(T+H)-N_0(T) \geq cH$ is true.

== Status ==
In 1942, Atle Selberg studied the problem 2 and proved that for any $\varepsilon > 0$ there exists such $T_0 = T_0(\varepsilon) > 0$ and $c = c(\varepsilon) > 0$, such that for $T \geq T_0$ and $H=T^{0.5+\varepsilon}$ the inequality $N(T+H)-N(T) \geq cH\log T$ is true.

In his turn, Selberg made his conjecture that it's possible to decrease the value of the exponent $a = 0.5$ for $H=T^{0.5+\varepsilon}$ which was proved 42 years later by A.A. Karatsuba.
