= A Mathematician's Miscellany =

Autobiography of John Edensor Littlewood

A Mathematician's Miscellany is an autobiography and collection of anecdotes by John Edensor Littlewood. It is now out of print but Littlewood's Miscellany is its successor, published by Cambridge University Press and edited by Béla Bollobás.

In a chapter "The Mathematician's Art of Work" at the end of the Littlewood's Miscellany edition Littlewood distinguishes 4 phases in creative work:

1. Preparation which requires the essential problem to be stripped of accidentals and brought clearly into view; all relevant knowledge surveyed; possible analogues pondered. It should be kept constantly before the mind during intervals of other work.
2. Incubation which he argues is the work of one's subconscious.
3. Illumination which tends to happen in a fraction of a second and this is almost when one's mind is relaxed and engaged only lightly if at all with ordinary matters. It is here that Littlewood recommends "the relaxed activity of shaving" as being likely to be a fruitful time for illumination
4. Verification

== Editions ==
- Littlewood, J. E. (1953), A Mathematician's Miscellany, London: Methuen, MR 0872858
- Littlewood, J. E. (1986), Bollobás, Béla (ed.), Littlewood's Miscellany, Cambridge: Cambridge University Press, ISBN 0-521-33058-0, MR 0872858
