= A Mathematician's Apology =

1940 essay by British mathematician G. H. Hardy

- 1st edition
- Author: G. H. Hardy
- Subjects: Philosophy of mathematics, mathematical beauty
- Publisher: Cambridge University Press
- Publication date: 1940
- OCLC: 488849413

A Mathematician's Apology is a 1940 essay by British mathematician G. H. Hardy which defends the pursuit of mathematics for its own sake. Central to Hardy's "apology" – in the sense of a formal justification or defence (as in Plato's Apology of Socrates) – is an argument that mathematics has value independent of its applications. Hardy located this value in what he called the beauty of mathematics and gave some examples of and criteria for mathematical beauty. The book also includes a brief autobiography which gives insight into the mind of a working mathematician.

== Background ==
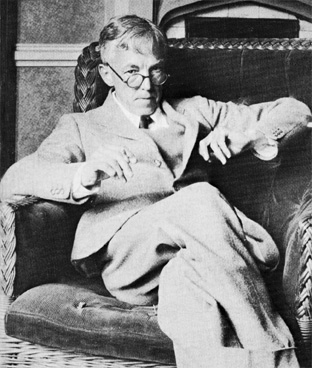
In A Mathematician's Apology, G. H. Hardy defined a set of criteria for mathematical beauty.

Hardy wished to justify his life's work in mathematics for two reasons. Firstly, having survived a heart attack and being at the age of 62, Hardy knew that he was approaching old age and that his mathematical creativity and skills were declining. By devoting time to writing the Apology, Hardy was admitting that his own time as a creative mathematician was finished. In his foreword to the 1967 edition of the book, C. P. Snow describes the Apology as "a passionate lament for creative powers that used to be and that will never come again". In Hardy's words, "Exposition, criticism, appreciation, is work for second-rate minds. [...] It is a melancholy experience for a professional mathematician to find himself writing about mathematics. The function of a mathematician is to do something, to prove new theorems, to add to mathematics, and not to talk about what he or other mathematicians have done."

Secondly, at the start of World War II, Hardy, a committed pacifist, wanted to justify his belief that mathematics should be pursued for its own sake rather than for the sake of its applications. He began writing on this subject when he was invited to contribute an article to Eureka, the journal of The Archimedeans (the Cambridge University student mathematical society). One of the topics the editor suggested was "something about mathematics and the war", and the result was the article "Mathematics in war-time". Hardy later incorporated this article into A Mathematician's Apology.

Hardy wanted to write a book in which he would explain his mathematical philosophy to the next generation of mathematicians. He hoped that in this book he could inspire future generations about the importance of mathematics without appealing to its applied uses.

Hardy initially submitted A Mathematician's Apology to Cambridge University Press with the intention of personally paying for its printing, but the Press decided to fund publication with an initial run of four thousand copies. For the 1940 first edition, Hardy sent postcards to the publisher requesting that presentation copies be sent to his sister Gertrude Emily Hardy (1878–1963), C. D. Broad, John Edensor Littlewood, Sir Arthur Eddington, C. P. Snow, the cricketer John Lomas (to whom G. H. Hardy dedicated the book), and others.

== Summary ==
One of the main themes of the book is the beauty that mathematics possesses, which Hardy compares to painting and poetry. For Hardy, the most beautiful mathematics was that which had no practical applications (pure mathematics) and, in particular number theory, Hardy's own field. Hardy contends that if useful knowledge is defined as knowledge which is likely to contribute to material comfort without respect to mere intellectual satisfaction, then most of higher mathematics is useless. He justifies the pursuit of pure mathematics with the argument that its very "uselessness" means that it cannot be misused to cause harm. On the other hand, Hardy denigrates much of the applied mathematics as either being "trivial", "ugly", or "dull" and contrasts it with "real mathematics", which is how he describes pure mathematics.

Hardy comments about a phrase attributed to Carl Friedrich Gauss: "Mathematics is the queen of the sciences, and number theory is the queen of mathematics." One may believe that it is the relative sparseness of number theory in applied mathematics that led Gauss to the above statement; however, Hardy points out that this is certainly not the case. If an application of number theory were to be found, then certainly no one would try to dethrone the "queen of mathematics" by it. What Gauss meant, according to Hardy, is that the underlying concepts that constitute number theory are deeper and more elegant compared to those of any other branch of mathematics.

Another theme is that mathematics is a "young man's game". Hardy believed that anyone with a talent for mathematics should develop and use that talent while they are young, before their ability to create original mathematics starts to decline in middle age. This view reflects Hardy's increasing depression at the waning of his own mathematical skill. For Hardy, real mathematics was essentially a creative activity, rather than an explanatory or expository one.

== Critiques ==
Hardy's opinions were heavily influenced by the academic culture of the universities of Cambridge and Oxford between World War I and World War II.

Some of Hardy's examples seem unfortunate in retrospect. For example, he writes, "No one has yet discovered any warlike purpose to be served by the theory of numbers or relativity, and it seems unlikely that anyone will do so for many years." Since then, number theory was used to crack German Enigma codes, and much later figured prominently in public-key cryptography; furthermore, the interconvertibility of mass and energy predicted by special relativity forms the physical basis for nuclear weapons.

Applicability itself is not the reason that Hardy considered applied mathematics inferior to pure mathematics. He considered that Rolle's theorem, for example, cannot be compared to the elegance and preeminence of the mathematics produced by Évariste Galois and other pure mathematicians, although it is of some importance for calculus.
