= G. H. Hardy =

British mathematician (1877–1947)

G. H. Hardy FRS
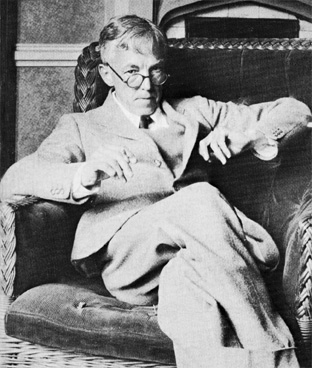
- Hardy, c. 1927
- Born: Godfrey Harold Hardy; 7 February 1877; Cranleigh, Surrey, England
- Died: 1 December 1947 (aged 70); Cambridge, Cambridgeshire, England
- Education: Winchester College; Trinity College, Cambridge
- Known for: Hardy–Weinberg principle Hardy–Ramanujan asymptotic formula Critical line theorem Hardy–Littlewood tauberian theorem Hardy space Hardy notation Hardy–Littlewood inequality Hardy's inequality Hardy's theorem Hardy–Littlewood circle method Hardy field Hardy–Littlewood zeta function conjectures
- Awards: Smith's Prize (1901); Royal Medal (1920); De Morgan Medal (1929); Chauvenet Prize (1932); Sylvester Medal (1940); Copley Medal (1947)
- Scientific career
- Fields: Mathematics
- Workplaces: University of Cambridge; University of Oxford
- Academic advisors: A. E. H. Love; E. T. Whittaker
- Doctoral students: Mary Cartwright; I. J. Good; Edward Linfoot; Cyril Offord; Harry Pitt; Richard Rado; Robert Rankin; Donald Spencer; Tirukkannapuram Vijayaraghavan; E. M. Wright
- Other notable students: Sydney Chapman; Edward Titchmarsh; Ethel Newbold

Godfrey Harold Hardy (7 February 1877 – 1 December 1947) was an English mathematician, known for his achievements in number theory and mathematical analysis. In biology, he is known for the Hardy–Weinberg principle, a basic principle of population genetics.

Hardy is famed for his 1940 essay A Mathematician's Apology, often considered one of the best insights into the mind of a working mathematician written for the layperson. The novelist Graham Greene ranked it with the notebooks of Henry James as "the best account of what it was like to be a creative artist."

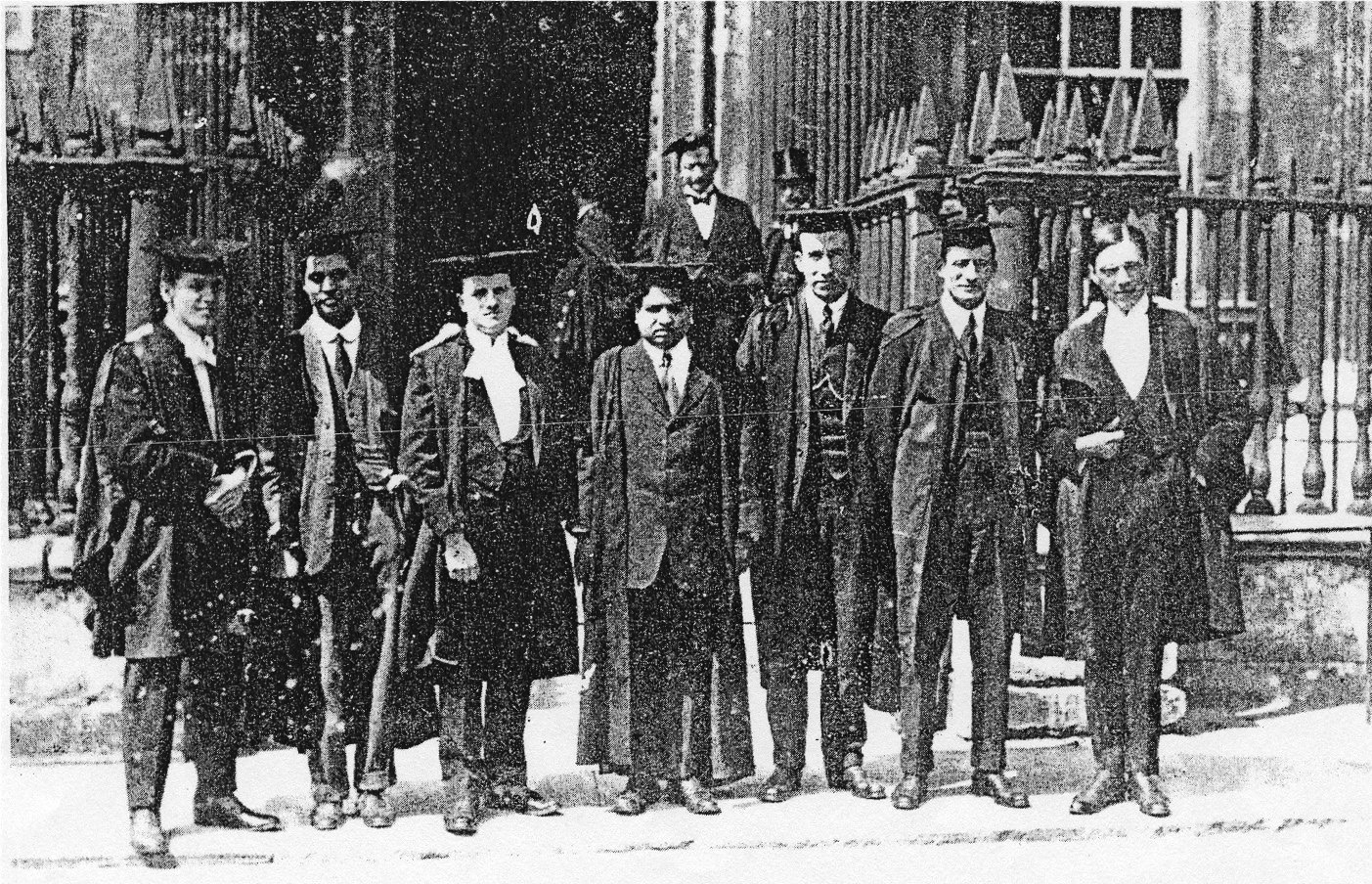
Charles F. Wilson, Srinivasa Ramanujan (centre), G. H. Hardy (extreme right), at the Senate House, Cambridge c. 1910s

Starting in 1914, Hardy was the mentor of the Indian mathematician Srinivasa Ramanujan, a relationship that has become celebrated. Hardy almost immediately recognised Ramanujan's extraordinary, albeit untutored, brilliance, and Hardy and Ramanujan became close collaborators. When asked by a young Paul Erdős what his greatest contribution to mathematics was, Hardy unhesitatingly replied that it was the discovery of Ramanujan. He remarked that on a scale of mathematical ability, his ability would be 25, Littlewood would be 30, Hilbert would be 80, and Ramanujan would be 100. In a lecture on Ramanujan, Hardy said that "my association with him is the one romantic incident in my life".

== Biography ==
G. H. Hardy was born on 7 February 1877, in Cranleigh, Surrey, England, into a teaching family. His father was Bursar and art master at Cranleigh School; his mother had been a senior mistress at Lincoln Training College for teachers. Both of his parents were mathematically inclined, though neither had a university education. He and his sister Gertrude "Gertie" Emily Hardy (1878–1963) were brought up by their educationally enlightened parents in a typical Victorian nursery attended by a nurse. At an early age, he argued with his nurse about the existence of Santa Claus and the efficacy of prayer. He read aloud to his sister books such as Don Quixote, Gulliver's Travels, and Robinson Crusoe.

Hardy's own natural affinity for mathematics was perceptible at an early age. When just two years old, he wrote numbers up to millions, and when taken to church he amused himself by factorising the numbers of the hymns.

After schooling at Cranleigh, Hardy was awarded a scholarship to Winchester College for his mathematical work. In 1896, he entered Trinity College, Cambridge. He was first tutored under Robert Rumsey Webb, but found it unsatisfying, and briefly considered switching to history. He then was tutored by Augustus Love, who recommended that he read Camille Jordan's Cours d'analyse, which taught him for the first time "what mathematics really meant". After only two years of preparation under his coach, Robert Alfred Herman, Hardy was fourth in the Mathematics Tripos examination. Years later, he sought to abolish the Tripos system, as he felt that it was becoming more an end in itself than a means to an end. While at university, Hardy joined the Cambridge Apostles, an elite, intellectual secret society.

Hardy cited as his most important influence his independent study of Cours d'analyse de l'École polytechnique, through which he became acquainted with the more precise mathematics tradition in continental Europe. In 1900 he passed part II of the Tripos, and in the same year he was elected to a Prize Fellowship at Trinity College. In 1903 he earned his M.A., which was the highest academic degree at English universities at that time. When his Prize Fellowship expired in 1906 he was appointed to the Trinity staff as a lecturer in mathematics, where teaching six hours per week left him time for research.

On 16 January 1913, Ramanujan wrote to Hardy, whom Ramanujan had known from studying Orders of Infinity (1910). Hardy read the letter in the morning, suspected it was a crank or a prank, but thought it over and realised in the evening that it was probably genuine, because "great mathematicians are commoner than thieves or humbugs of such incredible skill". He then invited Ramanujan to Cambridge and began "the one romantic incident in my life".

In the aftermath of the Bertrand Russell affair during World War I, in 1919 he left Cambridge to take the Savilian Chair of Geometry (and thus become a Fellow of New College) at Oxford. Hardy spent the academic year 1928–1929 at Princeton University in an academic exchange with Oswald Veblen, who spent the year at Oxford. Hardy gave the Josiah Willard Gibbs lecture for 1928. Hardy left Oxford and returned to Cambridge in 1931, becoming again a fellow of Trinity College and holding the Sadleirian Professorship until 1942. It is believed that he left Oxford for Cambridge to avoid the compulsory retirement at 65.

He was on the governing body of Abingdon School from 1922 to 1935.

In 1939, he suffered a coronary thrombosis, which prevented him from playing tennis, squash, and other sports. He also lost his creative powers in mathematics. He was constantly bored and distracted himself by writing a privately circulated memoir about the Bertrand Russell affair. In the early summer of 1947, he attempted suicide by barbiturate overdose. After that, he resolved to simply wait for death. He died suddenly one early morning while listening to his sister read out from a book of the history of Cambridge University cricket.

== Work ==
Hardy is credited with reforming British mathematics by bringing rigour into it, which was previously a characteristic of French, Swiss and German mathematics. British mathematicians had remained largely in the tradition of applied mathematics, in thrall to the reputation of Isaac Newton (see Cambridge Mathematical Tripos). Hardy was more in tune with the cours d'analyse methods dominant in France, and aggressively promoted his conception of pure mathematics, in particular against the hydrodynamics that was an important part of Cambridge mathematics.

Hardy preferred to work only 4 hours every day on mathematics, spending the rest of the day talking, playing cricket, and pursuing other gentlemanly activities.

From 1911, he collaborated with John Edensor Littlewood, in extensive work in mathematical analysis and analytic number theory. This (along with much else) led to quantitative progress on Waring's problem, as part of the Hardy–Littlewood circle method, as it became known. In prime number theory, they proved results and some notable conditional results. This was a major factor in the development of number theory as a system of conjectures; examples are the first and second Hardy–Littlewood conjectures. Hardy's collaboration with Littlewood is among the most successful and famous collaborations in mathematical history. In a 1947 lecture, the Danish mathematician Harald Bohr reported a colleague as saying, "Nowadays, there are only three really great English mathematicians: Hardy, Littlewood, and Hardy–Littlewood."

In November 1919, Hardy wrote to Bertrand Russell about his work with Littlewood.

"I wish you could find some tactful way of stirring up Littlewood to do a little writing. Heaven knows I am conscious of my huge debt to him ... but in our collaboration he will contribute ideas and ideas only ... all the tedious part has to be done by me [or] it simply won't be done ... I can get absolutely no help from him at all; not even an inquiry as to how I am getting on!"

Hardy is also known for formulating the Hardy–Weinberg principle, a basic principle of population genetics, independently from Wilhelm Weinberg in 1908. He played cricket with the geneticist Reginald Punnett, who introduced the problem to him in purely mathematical terms. Hardy, who had no interest in genetics and described the mathematical argument as "very simple", may never have realised how important the result became.

Hardy was elected an international honorary member of the American Academy of Arts and Sciences in 1921, an international member of the United States National Academy of Sciences in 1927, and an international member of the American Philosophical Society in 1939.

Hardy's collected papers have been published in seven volumes by Oxford University Press.

=== Pure mathematics ===
Hardy preferred his work to be considered pure mathematics, perhaps because of his detestation of war and the military uses to which mathematics had been applied. He made several statements similar to that in his Apology:

I have never done anything "useful". No discovery of mine has made, or is likely to make, directly or indirectly, for good or ill, the least difference to the amenity of the world.

However, aside from formulating the Hardy–Weinberg principle in population genetics, his famous work on integer partitions with his collaborator Ramanujan, known as the Hardy–Ramanujan asymptotic formula, has been widely applied in physics to find quantum partition functions of atomic nuclei (first used by Niels Bohr) and to derive thermodynamic functions of non-interacting Bose–Einstein systems. Though Hardy wanted his maths to be "pure" and devoid of any application, much of his work has found applications in other branches of science.

Moreover, Hardy deliberately pointed out in his Apology that mathematicians generally do not "glory in the uselessness of their work", but rather – because science can be used for evil ends as well as good – "mathematicians may be justified in rejoicing that there is one science at any rate, and that their own, whose very remoteness from ordinary human activities should keep it gentle and clean." Hardy also rejected as a "delusion" the belief that the difference between pure and applied mathematics had anything to do with their utility. Hardy regards as "pure" the kinds of mathematics that are independent of the physical world, but also considers some "applied" mathematicians, such as the physicists Maxwell and Einstein, to be among the "real" mathematicians, whose work "has permanent aesthetic value" and "is eternal because the best of it may, like the best literature, continue to cause intense emotional satisfaction to thousands of people after thousands of years." Although he admitted that what he called "real" mathematics may someday become useful, he asserted that, at the time in which the Apology was written, only the "dull and elementary parts" of either pure or applied mathematics could "work for good or ill".

== Personality ==
Hardy was extremely shy as a child and was socially awkward, cold and eccentric throughout his life. During his school years, he was top of his class in most subjects and won many prizes and awards, but hated having to receive them in front of the entire school. He was uncomfortable being introduced to new people, and could not bear to look at his own reflection in a mirror. It is said that, when staying in hotels, he would cover all the mirrors with towels.

Socially, Hardy was associated with the Bloomsbury Group and the Cambridge Apostles; G. E. Moore, Bertrand Russell and J. M. Keynes were friends. Apart from close friendships, he had a few platonic relationships with young men who shared his sensibilities, and often his love of cricket. A mutual interest in cricket led him to befriend the young C. P. Snow. Hardy was a lifelong bachelor and in his final years he was cared for by his sister.

He was an avid cricket fan. Maynard Keynes observed that if Hardy had read the stock exchange for half an hour every day with as much interest and attention as he did the day's cricket scores, he would have become a rich man. He liked to speak of the best class of mathematical research as "the Hobbs class", and later, after Bradman appeared as an even greater batsman, "the Bradman class".

Around the age of 20, he decided that he did not believe in God, which proved a minor issue because attending the chapel was compulsory at Cambridge University. He wrote a letter to his parents explaining that, and from then on he refused to go into any college chapel, even for purely ritualistic duties.

He was at times politically involved, if not an activist. He took part in the Union of Democratic Control during World War I, and For Intellectual Liberty in the late 1930s. He admired America and the Soviet Union roughly equally. He found both sides of the Second World War objectionable.

Freeman Dyson recalled:

He lectured the way the great Polish musician Wanda Landowska played Bach on the harpsichord: with precision and total lucidity, but displaying a passionate pleasure to all who could see beneath the surface. Each lecture was carefully prepared, like a work of art, with the intellectual denouement appearing as if spontaneously in the last five minutes of the hour. For me those lectures were an intoxicating joy, and I used to feel sometimes an impulse to hug that little old man with the white hair two feet away from me, to show him how desperately grateful we were to him for his willingness to go on talking.

Paul Hoffman writes that "His concerns were wide-ranging, as evidenced by six New Year's resolutions he set in a postcard to a friend:

(1) prove the Riemann hypothesis; (2) make 211 not out in the fourth innings of the last Test Match at the Oval; (3) find an argument for the nonexistence of God which shall convince the general public; (4) be the first man at the top of Mount Everest; (5) be proclaimed the first president of the U. S. S. R. of Great Britain and Germany; and (6) murder Mussolini.

== Cultural references ==
Hardy is a key character, played by Jeremy Irons, in the 2015 film The Man Who Knew Infinity, based on the biography of Ramanujan with the same title. Hardy is a major character in David Leavitt's historical fiction novel The Indian Clerk (2007), which depicts his Cambridge years and his relationship with John Edensor Littlewood and Ramanujan. Hardy is a secondary character in Uncle Petros and Goldbach's Conjecture (1992), a mathematics novel by Apostolos Doxiadis. Hardy is also a character in the 2014 Indian film, Ramanujan, played by Kevin McGowan.

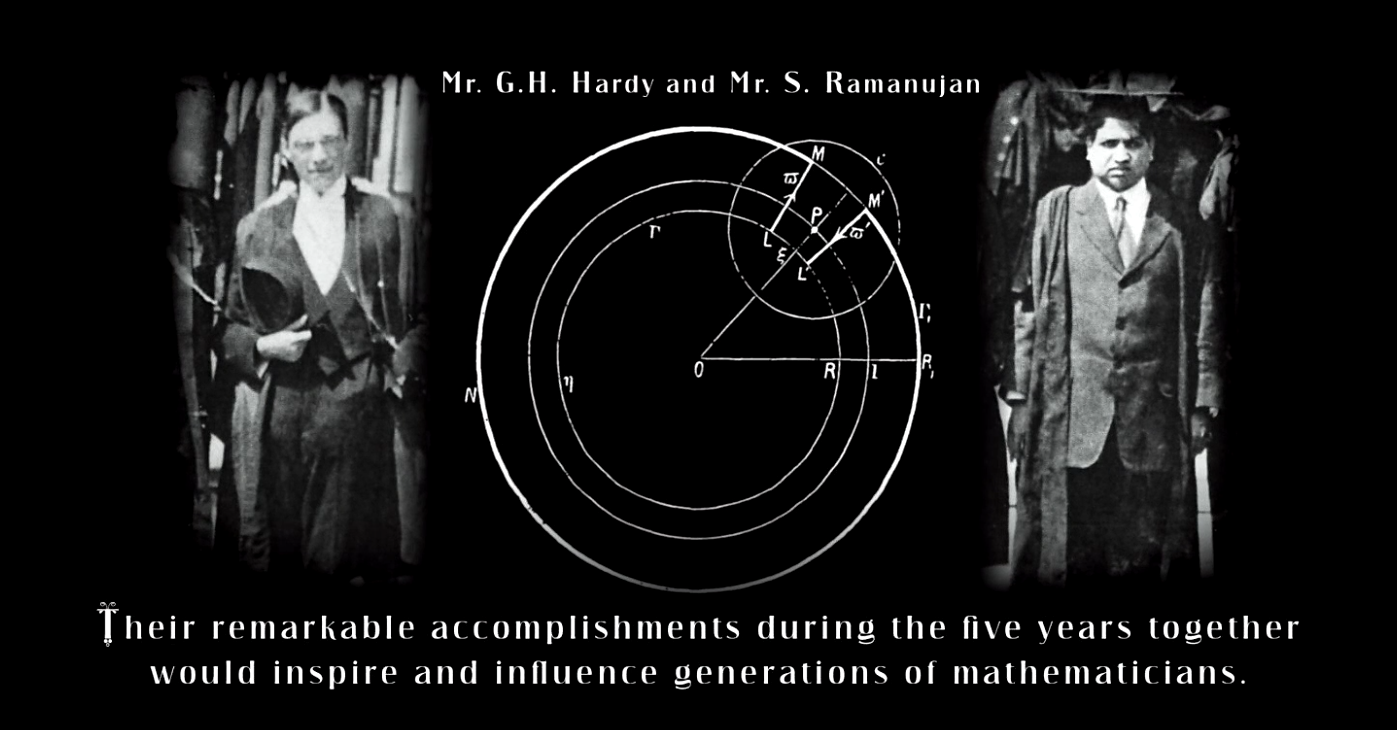
G. H. Hardy (left) and Srinivasa Ramanujan (right)

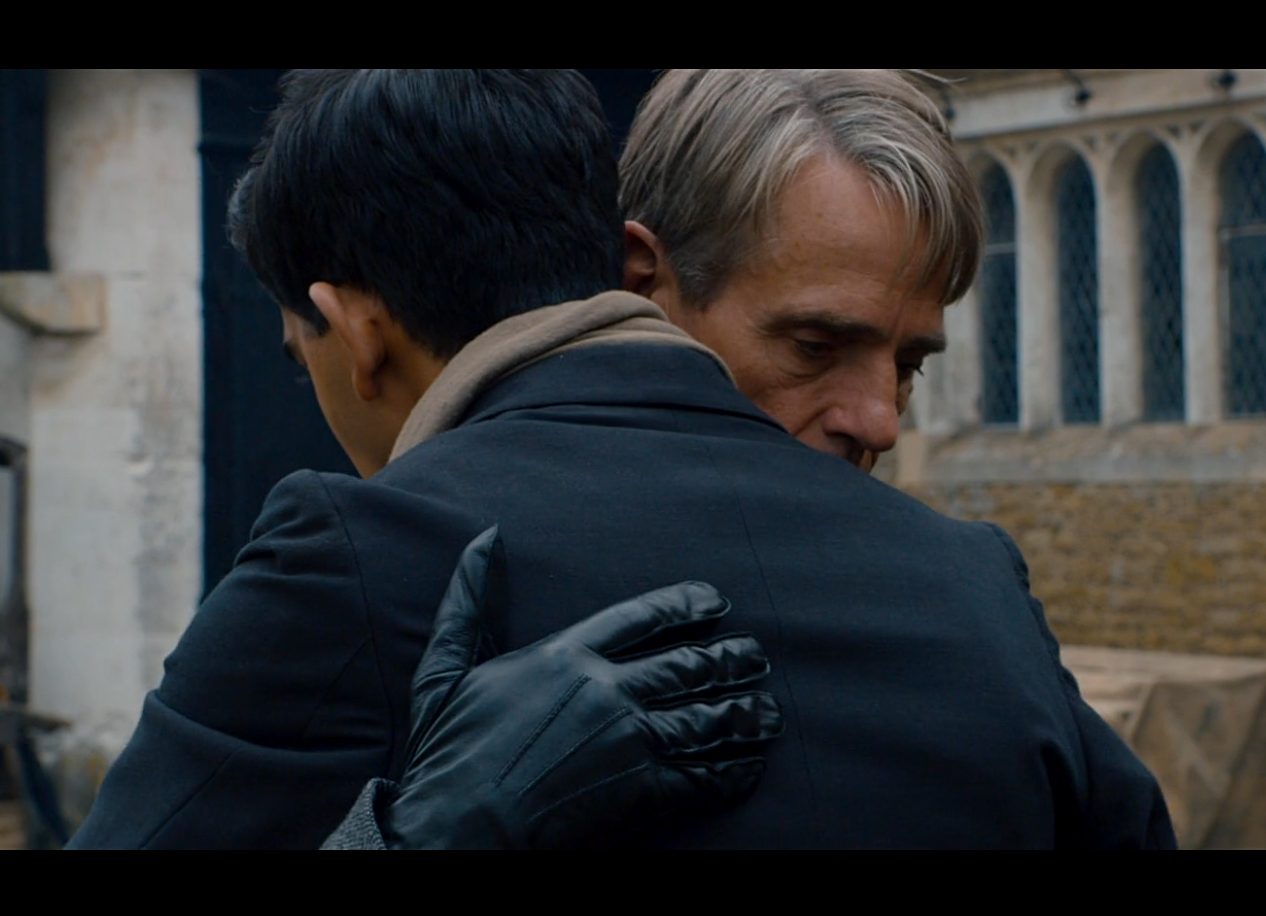
Jeremy Irons as Hardy and Dev Patel as Ramanujan in The Man Who Knew Infinity (2015)

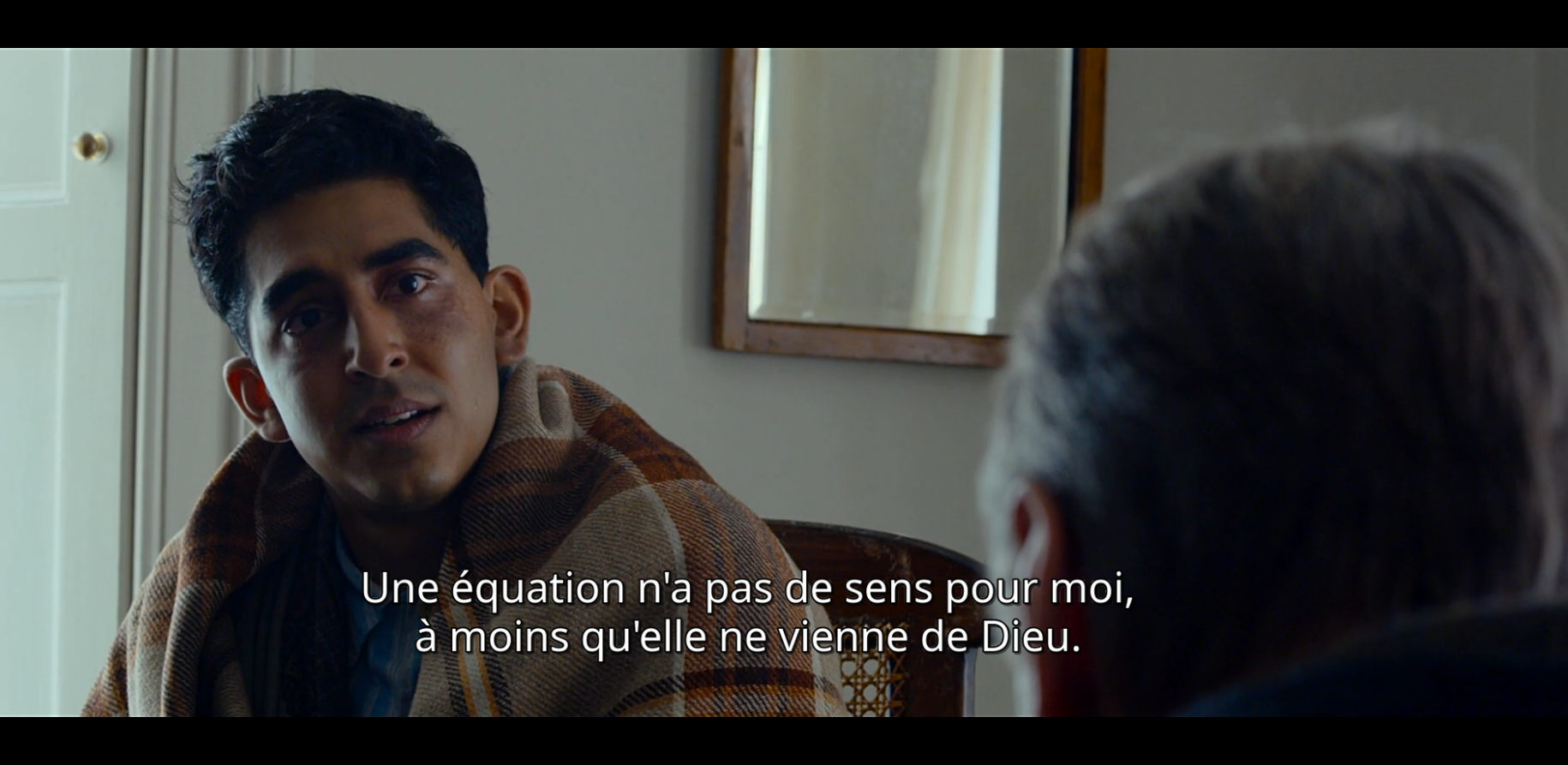
Dev Patel as Ramanujan (left) and Jeremy Irons as Hardy (right) in The Man Who Knew Infinity (2015)

== Bibliography ==
- Hardy, G. H. (2012) [1st pub. 1940, with foreword 1967]. A Mathematician's Apology. With a foreword by C. P. Snow. Cambridge: Cambridge University Press. ISBN 978-1-107-29559-9. Full text The reprinted Mathematician's Apology with an introduction by C.P. Snow was recommended by Marcus du Sautoy in the BBC Radio program A Good Read in 2007.
- Hardy, G. H. (1999) [1st pub. Cambridge University Press: 1940]. Ramanujan: Twelve Lectures on Subjects Suggested by his Life and Work. Providence, RI: AMS Chelsea. ISBN 978-0-8218-2023-0.
- Hardy, G. H.; Wright, E. M. (2008) [1st ed. 1938]. An Introduction to the Theory of Numbers. Revised by D. R. Heath-Brown and J. H. Silverman, with a foreword by Andrew Wiles (6th ed.). Oxford: Oxford University Press. ISBN 978-0-19-921985-8.
- Hardy, G. H. (2008) [1st ed. 1908]. A Course of Pure Mathematics. With a foreword by T. W. Körner (10th ed.). Cambridge University Press. ISBN 978-0-521-72055-7.
- Hardy, G. H. (2013) [1st ed. Clarendon Press: 1949]. Divergent Series (2nd ed.). Providence, RI: American Mathematical Society. ISBN 978-0-8218-2649-2. LCCN 49005496. MR 0030620. OCLC 808787. Full text
- Hardy, G. H. (1966–1979). London Mathematical Society committee (ed.). Collected papers of G. H. Hardy; including joint papers with J. E. Littlewood and others. Oxford: Clarendon Press. ISBN 0-19-853340-3. OCLC 823424.
- Hardy, G. H.; Littlewood, J. E.; Pólya, G. (1934). Inequalities (PDF) (1st ed.). Cambridge: Cambridge University Press.
- Hardy, G. H. (1970) [1st pub. 1942]. Bertrand Russell and Trinity. With a foreword by C. D. Broad. Cambridge University Press. ISBN 978-0-521-11392-2. Full text

== See also ==
- Critical line theorem
- Campbell–Hardy theorem
- Hardy hierarchy
- Hardy notation
- Hardy space
- Hardy–Hille formula
- Hardy–Littlewood definition
- Hardy–Littlewood inequality
- Hardy–Littlewood maximal function
- Hardy–Littlewood tauberian theorem
- Hardy–Littlewood zeta function conjectures
- Hardy–Ramanujan Journal
- Hardy–Ramanujan number
- Hardy–Ramanujan theorem
- Hardy's inequality
- Hardy's theorem
- Hardy field
- Hardy Z function
- Pisot–Vijayaraghavan number
- Ulam spiral
