= Hardy's theorem =

Theorem in complex analysis

In mathematics, Hardy's theorem is a result in complex analysis describing the behavior of holomorphic functions.

Let $f$ be a holomorphic function on the open ball centered at zero and radius $R$ in the complex plane, and assume that $f$ is not a constant function. If one defines

$$I(r) = \frac{1}{2\pi} \int_0^{2\pi}\! \left| f(r e^{i\theta}) \right| \,d\theta$$

for $0< r < R,$ then this function is strictly increasing and is a convex function of $\log r$.

== See also ==
- Maximum principle
- Hadamard three-circle theorem
