= Ronald Fisher bibliography =

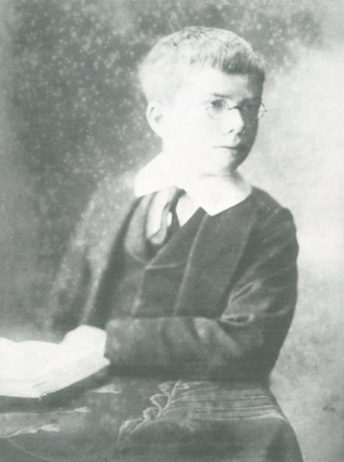
Ronald Fisher as a child

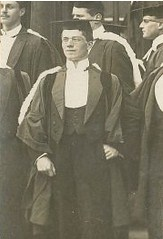
Fisher in his graduation ceremony at Cambridge University

The Ronald Fisher bibliography contains the works published by the English statistician and biologist Ronald Fisher (1890–1962).

== Books ==
- Statistical Methods for Research Workers. Edinburgh: Oliver & Boyd. 1925.
- The Genetical Theory of Natural Selection. Oxford: Clarendon Press. 1930.
- The Design of Experiments. Edinburgh: Oliver & Boyd. 1935.
- (with Frank Yates) Statistical Tables for Biological Agricultural and Medical Research. Edinburgh: Oliver & Boyd. 1938.
- Theory of Inbreeding. Edinburgh: Oliver & Boyd. 1949.
- Contributions to mathematical statistics. New York: Wiley. 1950.
- Statistical Methods and Scientific Inference. Edinburgh: Oliver & Boyd. 1956.

=== Book chapters ===
- Heath, AE, ed. (1951). "Statistics". Scientific Thought in the Twentieth Century. London: Watts & Company.
- Huxley, J; Hardy, AC; Ford, EB, eds. (1954). "Retrospect of criticisms of the theory of natural selection". Evolution as a process. London: Allen & Unwin. pp. 84–98.

=== Collections ===
- Bennett, JH, ed. (1971). Collected papers of R.A. Fisher. University of Adelaide.
- Bennett, JH, ed. (1990). Statistical Methods, Experimental Design and Scientific Inference. Oxford University Press.

== Journal articles ==
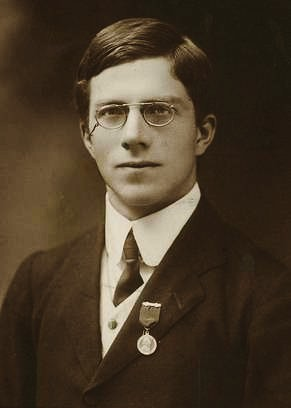
Ronald Fisher in 1913

=== 1910s ===
- "On an Absolute Criterion for Fitting Frequency Curves". Messenger of Mathematics. 41: 155–160. 1912.
- "Applications of Vector analysis to Geometry". Messenger of Mathematics. 42: 161–178. 1913.
- Fisher, R. A. (1914). "Some Hopes of a Eugenist". Eugenics Review. 5 (4): 309–315. PMC 2986993. PMID 21259575.
- Fisher, R. A. (1915). "Frequency Distribution of the Values of the Correlation Coefficient in Samples from an Indefinitely Large Population". Biometrika. 10 (4): 507–521. doi:10.1093/biomet/10.4.507.
- Fisher, R. A. (1915). "The evolution of sexual preference". Eugenics Review. 7 (3): 184–192. PMC 2987134. PMID 21259607.
- (with CS Stock) Fisher, R. A.; Stock, C. S. (1915). "Cuénot on preadaptation. A criticism". Eugenics Review. 7 (1): 46–61. PMC 2987108. PMID 21259602.
- Fisher, R. A. (1916). "Biometrika". Eugenics Review. 8 (1): 62–64. PMC 2990418. PMID 21259616.
- Fisher, R. A. (1918). "The Correlation Between Relatives on the Supposition of Mendelian Inheritance". Transactions of the Royal Society of Edinburgh. 52 (2): 399–433. doi:10.1017/s0080456800012163. S2CID 181213898.
- Fisher, R. A. (1919). "The genesis of twins". Genetics. 4 (5): 489–499. doi:10.1093/genetics/4.5.489. PMC 1200469. PMID 17245935.

=== 1920s ===
- Fisher, R. A. (1920). "A Mathematical Examination of the Methods of Determining the Accuracy of an Observation by the Mean Error, and by the Mean Square Error". Monthly Notices of the Royal Astronomical Society. 80 (8): 758–770. Bibcode:1920MNRAS..80..758F. doi:10.1093/mnras/80.8.758. hdl:2440/15168.
- Fisher, R. A. (1921). "Some Remarks on the Methods Formulated in a Recent Article on the Quantitative Analysis of Plant Growth". Annals of Applied Biology. 7 (4): 367–372. doi:10.1111/j.1744-7348.1921.tb05524.x. hdl:2440/15171.
- Fisher, R. A. (1921). "Studies in Crop Variation. I. An examination of the yield of dressed grain from Broadbalk". Journal of Agricultural Science. 11 (2): 107–135. doi:10.1017/S0021859600003750. hdl:2440/15170. S2CID 86029217.
- "On the "Probable Error" of a Coefficient of Correlation Deduced from a Small Sample". Metron. 1. 1921.
- "On the dominance ratio". Proceedings of the Royal Society of Edinburgh. 42: 321–41. 1922.
- "Statistical Appendix to a Paper by J. Davidson on Biological Studies of Aphis rumicis". Annals of Applied Biology. 9: 142–145. 1922. doi:10.1111/j.1744-7348.1922.tb05944.x.
- Fisher, R. A. (1922). "Darwinian Evolution by Mutations". Eugenics Review. 14 (1): 31–34. PMC 2942494. PMID 21259738.
- Fisher, R. A. (1922). "The Goodness of Fit of Regression Formulae and the Distribution of Regression Coefficients". Journal of the Royal Statistical Society. 85 (4): 597–612. doi:10.2307/2341124. JSTOR 2341124. PMC 1084801.
- Fisher, R. A. (1922). "On the Interpretation of χ^{2} from Contingency Tables, and the Calculation of P". Journal of the Royal Statistical Society. 85 (1): 87–94. doi:10.2307/2340521. JSTOR 2340521.
- Fisher, R. A. (1922). "On the Mathematical Foundations of Theoretical Statistics". Philosophical Transactions of the Royal Society A. 222 (594–604): 309–368. Bibcode:1922RSPTA.222..309F. doi:10.1098/rsta.1922.0009. hdl:2440/15172.
- "On the Dominance Ratio". Proceedings of the Royal Society of Edinburgh. 42: 321–341. 1922.
- (with WA Mackenzie) Fisher, R. A.; MacKenzie, Winifred A. (1922). "The Correlation of Weekly Rainfall". Quarterly Journal of the Royal Meteorological Society. 48 (203): 234–242. Bibcode:1922QJRMS..48..234F. doi:10.1002/qj.49704820305. hdl:2440/15175.
- (with HG Thornton and WA Mackenzie) Fisher, R. A.; Thornton, H. G.; MacKenzie, W. A. (1922). "The Accuracy of the Plating Method of Estimating the Density of Bacterial Populations". Annals of Applied Biology. 9 (3–4): 325–359. doi:10.1111/j.1744-7348.1922.tb05962.x. hdl:2440/15176.
- "Note on Dr. Burnside's recent paper on errors of observation". Proceedings of the Cambridge Philosophical Society. 21: 655–658. 1923.
- Fisher, R. A. (1923). "Statistical Tests of Agreement Between Observation and Hypothesis". Economica. 3 (8): 139–147. doi:10.2307/2548482. hdl:2440/15178. JSTOR 2548482.
- "Review of A Treatise on Probability by J.M. Keynes". Eugenics Review. 14: 46–50. 1923.
- (with WA Mackenzie) Fisher, R. A.; MacKenzie, W. A. (1923). "Studies in Crop Variation. II. The manurial response of different potato varieties". Journal of Agricultural Science. 13 (3): 311–320. doi:10.1017/S0021859600003592. hdl:2440/15179. S2CID 85985907.
- Fisher, R. A. (1924). "The biometrical study of heredity". Eugenics Review. 16 (3): 189–210. PMC 2942624. PMID 21259793.
- "The Conditions Under Which χ^{2} Measures the Discrepancy Between Observation and Hypothesis". Journal of the Royal Statistical Society. 87: 442–450. 1924.
- "The Distribution of the Partial Correlation Coefficient". Metron. 3: 329–332. 1924.
- Fisher, R. A. (1924). "Studies in crop variation. III. The influence of rainfall on the yield of wheat at Rothamsted". Philosophical Transactions of the Royal Society B. 213 (402–410): 89–142. doi:10.1098/rstb.1925.0003.
- "On a Distribution Yielding the Error Functions of Several Well Known Statistics". Proceedings of the International Congress of Mathematics. 2: 805–813. 1924.
- "The Theory of the Mechanical Analysis of Sediments by Means of the Automatic Balance". Proceedings of the Royal Society of Edinburgh. 44: 98–115. 1924.
- "A Method of Scoring Coincidences in Tests with Playing Cards". Proceedings of the Society for Psychical Research. 34: 181–185. 1924.
- ( with S Odén) "The theory of the Mechanical analysis of Sediments by Means of the Automatic Balance". Proceedings of the Royal Society of Edinburgh. 44: 98–115. 1924.
- "Expansion of "Student's" integral in Powers of n^{−1}". Metron. 5: 109–120. 1925.
- "Applications of "Student's" Distribution". Metron. 5: 90–104. 1925.
- Fisher, R. A. (1925). "Theory of Statistical Estimation". Proceedings of the Cambridge Philosophical Society. 22 (5): 700–725. Bibcode:1925PCPS...22..700F. doi:10.1017/S0305004100009580. hdl:2440/15186. S2CID 62064968.
- (with PR Ansell) "Note on the Numerical Evaluation of a Bessel Function Derivative". Proceedings of the London Mathematical Society. 24: liv–lvi. 1925.
- "Sur La Solution De L'Équation intégrale De M.V. Romanovsky". Comptes Rendus de l'Académie des Sciences. 181: 88–89. 1925.
- Fisher, R. A. (1926). "Bayes' Theorem and the Fourfold Table". Eugenics Review. 18 (1): 32–33. PMC 2984620. PMID 21259825.
- "The Arrangement of Field Experiments". Journal of the Ministry of Agriculture of Great Britain. 33: 503–513. 1926.
- Fisher, R. A. (1926). "On the Random Sequence". Quarterly Journal of the Royal Meteorological Society. 52 (219): 250. Bibcode:1926QJRMS..52..250F. doi:10.1002/qj.49705221904.
- Fisher, R. A. (1926). "On the Capillary Forces in an Ideal Soil: Correction of Formulae Given by W.B. Haines". Journal of Agricultural Science. 16 (3): 492–503. doi:10.1017/S0021859600007838. S2CID 86119436.
- Fisher, R. A. (1927). "The Actuarial Treatment of Official Birth Records". Eugenics Review. 19 (2): 103–108. PMC 2987494. PMID 21259852.
- Thornton, H G; Fisher, R A (1927). "On the Existence of Daily Changes in the Bacterial Numbers in American Soil". Soil Science. 23 (4): 253–259. Bibcode:1927SoilS..23..253T. doi:10.1097/00010694-192704000-00001. hdl:2440/15195. S2CID 93102900.
- Fisher, R. A. (1927). "On Some Objections to Mimicry Theory — Statistical and Genetic". Transactions of the Royal Entomological Society of London. 75 (2): 269–278. doi:10.1111/j.1365-2311.1927.tb00074.x. hdl:2440/15100.
- (with J Wishart) Fisher, R. A.; Wishart, J. (1927). "On the Distribution of the Error of an Interpolated Value, and on the Construction of Tables". Proceedings of the Cambridge Philosophical Society. 23 (8): 912–921. Bibcode:1927PCPS...23..912F. doi:10.1017/S0305004100013785. hdl:2440/15194. S2CID 62645396.
- (with T Eden) Eden, T.; Fisher, R. A. (1927). "Studies in Crop Variation. IV. the Experimental Determination of the Value of top Dressings with Cereals" (PDF). Journal of Agricultural Science. 17 (4): 548–562. doi:10.1017/S0021859600018827. S2CID 86173781.
- (with HG Thornton) Thornton, H G; Fisher, R A (1927). "On the Existence of Daily Changes in the Bacterial Numbers in American Soil". Soil Science. 23 (4): 253–259. Bibcode:1927SoilS..23..253T. doi:10.1097/00010694-192704000-00001. hdl:2440/15195. S2CID 93102900.
- Fisher, R. A. (1928). "The Possible Modification of the Response of the Wild Type to Recurrent Mutations". American Naturalist. 62 (679): 115–126. doi:10.1086/280193. hdl:2440/15102. S2CID 53370853.
- Fisher, R. A. (1928). "Two Further Notes on the Origin of Dominance". American Naturalist. 62 (683): 571–574. doi:10.1086/280234. hdl:2440/15103. S2CID 53560887.
- "On a Property Connecting the χ^{2} Measure of Discrepancy with the Method of Maximum Likelihood". Atti del Congresso Internazionale dei Matematici. 6: 95–100. 1928.
- Fisher, R. A. (1928). "The General Sampling Distribution of the Multiple Correlation Coefficient". Proceedings of the Royal Society A. 121 (788): 654–673. Bibcode:1928RSPSA.121..654F. doi:10.1098/rspa.1928.0224. hdl:2440/15196.
- Fisher, R. A. (1928). "Triplet children in Great Britain and Ireland". Proceedings of the Royal Society B. 102 (717): 286–311. Bibcode:1928RSPSB.102..286F. doi:10.1098/rspb.1928.0005. hdl:2440/15104.
- "The Effect of Psychological Card Preferences". Proceedings of the Society for Psychical Research. 38: 269–271. 1928.
- (with LHC Tippett) Fisher, R. A.; Tippett, L. H. C. (1928). "Limiting Forms of the Frequency Distribution of the Largest of Smallest Member of a Sample". Proceedings of the Cambridge Philosophical Society. 24 (2): 180–190. Bibcode:1928PCPS...24..180F. doi:10.1017/S0305004100015681. S2CID 123125823.
- Fisher, R. A. (1928). "Further Note on the Capillary Forces in an Ideal Soil". Journal of Agricultural Science. 18 (3): 406–410. doi:10.1017/S0021859600019432. S2CID 85821840.
- Fisher, R. A. (1928). "Correlation Coefficients in Meteorology". Nature. 121 (3053): 712. Bibcode:1928Natur.121..712F. doi:10.1038/121712a0. S2CID 8279654.
- (with TN Hoblyn) Fisher, R. A.; Hoblyn, T. N. (1928). "Maximum- and Minimum-Correlation Tables in Comparative Climatology". Geografiska Annaler. 10: 267–281. doi:10.2307/519800. JSTOR 519800.
- Fisher, R. A. (1929). "The Evolution of Dominance; Reply to Professor Sewall Wright". American Naturalist. 63 (689): 553–556. doi:10.1086/280289. hdl:2440/15105. S2CID 84667207.
- Fisher, R. A. (1929). "The Sieve of Eratosthenes". Mathematical Gazette. 14 (204): 564–566. doi:10.2307/3607073. hdl:2440/15202. JSTOR 3607073. S2CID 126000646.
- Fisher, R. A. (1929). "Moments and Product Moments of Sampling Distributions". Proceedings of the London Mathematical Society. 30: 199–238. doi:10.1112/plms/s2-30.1.199. hdl:2440/15200.
- Fisher, R. A. (1929). "Tests of Significance in Harmonic Analysis". Proceedings of the Royal Society A. 125 (796): 54–59. Bibcode:1929RSPSA.125...54F. doi:10.1098/rspa.1929.0151. hdl:2440/15201.
- "The Statistical Method in Psychical Research". Proceedings of the Society for Psychical Research. 39: 189–192. 1929.
- (with T Eden) Eden, T.; Fisher, R. A. (1929). "Studies in Crop Variation. VI. Experiments on the response of the potato to potash and nitrogen". Journal of Agricultural Science. 19 (2): 201–213. doi:10.1017/S0021859600011254. hdl:2440/15203. S2CID 97291894.
- Fisher, R. A. (1929). "Statistics and Biological Research". Nature. 124 (3120): 266–267. Bibcode:1929Natur.124..266F. doi:10.1038/124266a0. S2CID 4119995.

=== 1930s ===
- Fisher, R. A. (1930). "The Evolution of Dominance in Certain Polymorphic Species". American Naturalist. 64 (694): 385–406. doi:10.1086/280325. hdl:2440/15107. S2CID 55957988.
- Fisher, R. A. (1930). "Mortality Amongst Plants and its Bearing on Natural Selection". Nature. 125 (3165): 972–973. Bibcode:1930Natur.125..972F. doi:10.1038/125972a0. hdl:2440/15108. S2CID 4065579.
- Fisher, R. A. (1930). "Inverse Probability". Proceedings of the Cambridge Philosophical Society. 26 (4): 528–535. Bibcode:1930PCPS...26..528F. doi:10.1017/S0305004100016297. hdl:2440/15206.
- Fisher, R. A. (1930). "The Moments of the Distribution for Normal Samples of Measures of Departure From Normality". Proceedings of the Royal Society A. 130 (812): 16–28. Bibcode:1930RSPSA.130...16F. doi:10.1098/rspa.1930.0185. hdl:2440/15205.
- "The Distribution of Gene Ratios for Rare Mutations". Proceedings of the Royal Society of Edinburgh. 50: 205–220. 1930.
- (with J Wishart) "The Arrangement of Field Experiments and the Statistical Reduction of the Results". Imperial Bureau of Soil Science Technical Communication. 10. 1930.
- Fisher, R. A. (1931). "The Evolution of Dominance". Biological Reviews. 6 (4): 345–368. doi:10.1111/j.1469-185X.1931.tb01030.x. S2CID 54026983.
- "The Sampling Error of Estimated Deviates, Together with Other Illustrations of the Properties and Applications of the Integrals and Derivatives of the Normal Error Function". Mathematical Tables. 1: xxvi–xxxv. 1931.
- Fisher, R. A.; Wishart, J. (1931). "The Derivation of the Pattern Formulae of Two-Way Partitions From Those of Simpler Patterns". Proceedings of the London Mathematical Society. 33: 195–208. doi:10.1112/plms/s2-33.1.195. hdl:2440/15208.
- "Principles of Plot Experimentation in relation to the Statistical Interpretation of the Results". Report of a Conference on the Technique of Field Experiments Held at Rothamsted on 7 May 1931. 1931.
- (with S Bartlett) Fisher, R. A.; Bartlett, S. (1931). "Pasteurised and Raw Milk". Nature. 127 (3207): 591–592. Bibcode:1931Natur.127..591F. doi:10.1038/127591c0. S2CID 4097093.
- "The evolutionary modification of genetic phenomena". Proc 6th Int Congr Genetics. 1: 165–172. 1932.
- Fisher, R. A. (1932). "Inverse Probability and the Use of Likelihood". Proceedings of the Cambridge Philosophical Society. 28 (3): 257–261. Bibcode:1932PCPS...28..257F. doi:10.1017/S0305004100010094. hdl:2440/15211. S2CID 122955631.
- "The Bearing of Genetics on Theories of Evolution". Science Progress in the Twentieth Century (1919–1933). 27 (106). London: John Murray: 273–287. 1932. hdl:2440/15112. – The UoA – PDF reproduced with permission of Science Reviews Ltd; or JSTOR 43429513
- (with FR Immer and O Tedlin) Fisher, R. A.; Immer, F. R.; Tedin, Olof (1932). "The Genetical Interpretation of Statistics of the Third Degree in the Study of Quantitative Inheritance". Genetics. 17 (2): 107–124. doi:10.1093/genetics/17.2.107. PMC 1201652. PMID 17246646.
- Fisher, R. A. (1933). "Selection in the Production of the Ever-Sporting Stocks". Annals of Botany. 47 (4): 727–733. doi:10.1093/oxfordjournals.aob.a090411. – Oxford Academic whose index record for article erroneously shows "R. A. Fishers [sic], F.R.S."
- "The Contributions of Rothamsted to the Development of the Science of Statistics". Annual Report Rothamsted Experimental Station. 43–50. 1933.
- Fisher, R. A. (1933). "The Concepts of Inverse Probability and Fiducial Probability Referring to Unknown Parameters". Proceedings of the Royal Society A. 139 (838): 343–348. Bibcode:1933RSPSA.139..343F. doi:10.1098/rspa.1933.0021. hdl:2440/15212.
- Fisher, R. A. (1933). "On the Evidence Against the Chemical Induction of Melanism in Lepidoptera". Proceedings of the Royal Society B. 112 (778): 407–416. Bibcode:1933RSPSB.112..407F. doi:10.1098/rspb.1933.0018. hdl:2440/15114.
- Fisher, R. A. (1934). "Randomisation, and an Old Enigma of Card Play". Mathematical Gazette. 18 (231): 297. doi:10.2307/3605473. hdl:2440/15217. JSTOR 3605473. S2CID 193691920.
- Fisher, R. A. (1934). "Indeterminism and Natural Selection". Philosophy of Science. 1: 99–117. doi:10.1086/286308. hdl:2440/15119. S2CID 55642036.
- "Some Results of an Experiment on Dominance in Poultry, with Special Reference to Polydactyly". Proceedings of the Linnean Society of London. 147: 71–81. 1934.
- Fisher, R. A. (1934). "Two New Properties of Mathematical Likelihood". Proceedings of the Royal Society A. 144 (852): 285–307. Bibcode:1934RSPSA.144..285F. doi:10.1098/rspa.1934.0050. hdl:2440/15214.
- Fisher, R. A. (1934). "Probability, Likelihood and Quantity of Information in the Logic of Uncertain Inference". Proceedings of the Royal Society A. 146 (856): 1–8. Bibcode:1934RSPSA.146....1F. doi:10.1098/rspa.1934.0134. hdl:2440/15215.
- Thornton, H. G.; Gray, P. H. H. (1934). "Appendix to a Paper by H.G. Thornton and P.H.H. Gray on the Numbers of Bacterial Cells in Field Soils". Proceedings of the Royal Society B. 115 (795): 540–542. doi:10.1098/rspb.1934.0057.
- "Adaptation and Mutations : A Lecture to the Science Masters' Association". School Science Review. 15: 294–301. 1934.
- Fisher, R. A. (1934). "Crest and Hernia in Fowls Due to a Single Gene Without Dominance". Science. 80 (2074): 288–289. Bibcode:1934Sci....80..288F. doi:10.1126/science.80.2074.288. hdl:2440/15117. PMID 17789297. S2CID 33456787.
- (with F Yates) Fisher, R. A.; Yates, F. (1934). "The 6 × 6 Latin Squares". Proceedings of the Cambridge Philosophical Society. 30 (4): 492–507. Bibcode:1934PCPS...30..492F. doi:10.1017/S0305004100012731. S2CID 120585553.
- "Contribution to a Discussion of J. Neyman'S Paper on the Two Different Aspects of the Representative Method". Journal of the Royal Statistical Society. 97: 614–619. 1934.
- Fisher, K. A. (1935). "Statistical Tests". Nature. 136 (3438): 474. Bibcode:1935Natur.136..474F. doi:10.1038/136474b0. S2CID 4105556.
- Fisher, R. A. (1935). "The Sheltering of Lethals". American Naturalist. 69 (724): 446–455. doi:10.1086/280618. hdl:2440/15121. S2CID 83933317.
- "The Case of Zero Survivors in Probit Assays". Annals of Applied Biology. 22: 164–165. 1935. doi:10.1111/j.1744-7348.1935.tb07713.x.
- Fisher, R. A. (1935). "The Fiducial Argument in Statistical Inference". Annals of Eugenics. 6 (4): 391–398. doi:10.1111/j.1469-1809.1935.tb02120.x. hdl:2440/15222.
- Fisher, R. A. (1935). "The Mathematical Distributions Used in the Common Tests of Significance". Econometrica. 3 (4): 353–365. doi:10.2307/1905628. hdl:2440/15219. JSTOR 1905628.
- "Contribution to a Discussion of J. Neyman's Paper on Statistical Problems in Agricultural Experimentation". Journal of the Royal Statistical Society. 2: 154–157. 1935.
- "Contribution to a discussion of F. Yates' Paper on Complex Experiments". Journal of the Royal Statistical Society. 2: 229–231. 1935.
- Fisher, R. A. (1935). "The Logic of Inductive Inference". Journal of the Royal Statistical Society. 98 (1): 39–54. doi:10.2307/2342435. hdl:2440/15220. JSTOR 2342435.
- Fisher, R. A. (1935). "Dominance in Poultry". Philosophical Transactions of the Royal Society B. 225 (523): 197–226. Bibcode:1935RSPTB.225..197F. doi:10.1098/rstb.1935.0011. hdl:2440/15122.
- Fisher, R.A. (1936). "Has Mendel's Work been Rediscovered?". Annals of Science. 1 (2): 115–137. doi:10.1080/00033793600200111. hdl:2440/15123.
- Fisher, R. A. (1936). "The Use of Multiple Measurements in Taxonomic Problems". Annals of Eugenics. 7 (2): 179–188. doi:10.1111/j.1469-1809.1936.tb02137.x. hdl:2440/15227.
- Fisher, R. A. (1936). ""The Coefficient of Racial Likeness" and the Future of Craniometry". Journal of the Royal Anthropological Institute. 66: 57–63. doi:10.2307/2844116. hdl:2440/15228. JSTOR 2844116.
- Fisher, Ronald Aylmer (1936). "Uncertain Inference". Proceedings of the American Academy of Arts and Sciences. 71 (4): 245–258. doi:10.2307/20023225. hdl:2440/15226. JSTOR 20023225.
- "The Measurement of Selective Intensity". Proceedings of the Royal Society B. 121: 58–62. 1936.
- (with DMS Watson, NW Timofeeff-Ressovsky, EJ Salisbury, WB Turrill, TJ Jenkin, RR Gates et al) Watson, D. M. S.; Timofeeff-Ressovsky, N. W.; Salisbury, E. J.; Turrill, W. B.; Jenkin, T. J.; Gates, R. R.; Fisher, R. A.; Diver, C.; Carpenter, G. D. H.; Haldane, J. B. S.; MacBride, E. W.; Salaman, R. N. (1936). "A Discussion on the Present State of the Theory of Natural Selection". Proceedings of the Royal Society B. 121 (820): 43–73. Bibcode:1936RSPSB.121...43W. doi:10.1098/rspb.1936.0052.
- Fisher, R. A. (1936). "The Half-Drill Strip System Agricultural Experiments". Nature. 138 (3504): 1101. Bibcode:1936Natur.138.1101F. doi:10.1038/1381101a0. S2CID 4015295.
- (with S Barbacki) Barbacki, S.; Fisher, R. A. (1936). "A Test of the Supposed Precision of Systematic Arrangements". Annals of Eugenics. 7 (2): 189–193. doi:10.1111/j.1469-1809.1936.tb02138.x.
- Fisher, R. A. (1937). "Professor Karl Pearson and the Method of Moments". Annals of Eugenics. 7 (4): 303–318. doi:10.1111/j.1469-1809.1937.tb02149.x.
- Fisher, R. A. (1937). "The Wave of Advance of Advantageous Genes". Annals of Eugenics. 7 (4): 355–369. doi:10.1111/j.1469-1809.1937.tb02153.x. hdl:2440/15125.
- Fisher, R. A. (1937). "On a Point Raised by M.S. Bartlett on Fiducial Probability". Annals of Eugenics. 7 (4): 370–375. doi:10.1111/j.1469-1809.1937.tb02154.x. hdl:2440/15231.
- Fisher, R. A. (1937). "The Relation Between Variability and Abundance Shown by the Measurements of the Eggs of British Nesting Birds". Proceedings of the Royal Society B. 122 (826): 1–26. Bibcode:1937RSPSB.122....1.. doi:10.1098/rspb.1937.0006. hdl:2440/15126.
- (with EA Cornish) Cornish, E. A.; Fisher, R. A. (1937). "Moments and Cumulants in the Specification of Distributions". Revue de l'Institut International de Statistique. 5 (4): 307–320. doi:10.2307/1400905. hdl:2440/15229. JSTOR 1400905.
- (with B Day) Day, B.; Fisher, R. A. (1937). "The Comparison of Variability in Populations Having Unequal Means. An example of the analysis of covariance with multiple dependent and independent variates". Annals of Eugenics. 7 (4): 333–348. doi:10.1111/j.1469-1809.1937.tb02151.x. hdl:2440/15230.
- Fisher, R. A. (1938). "The Statistical Utilization of Multiple Measurements". Annals of Eugenics. 8 (4): 376–386. doi:10.1111/j.1469-1809.1938.tb02189.x. hdl:2440/15232.
- "Quelques Remarques sur l'estimation en Statistique". Biotypologie. 6: 153–158. 1938.
- Fisher, R. A. (1938). "Dominance in Poultry: feathered feet, rose comb, internal pigment and pile". Proceedings of the Royal Society B. 125 (838): 25–48. Bibcode:1938RSPSB.125...25F. doi:10.1098/rspb.1938.0011. hdl:2440/15127.
- Fisher, R. A. (1938). "On the Statistical Treatment of the Relation Between Sea-Level Characteristics and High-Altitude Acclimatization". Proceedings of the Royal Society B. 126 (842): 25–29. Bibcode:1938RSPSB.126...25F. doi:10.1098/rspb.1938.0044.
- Fisher, R. A. (1938). "The Mathematics of Experimentation". Nature. 142 (3592): 442–443. Bibcode:1938Natur.142..442F. doi:10.1038/142442a0.
- Fisher, R. A. (1939). "A Note on Fiducial inference". Annals of Mathematical Statistics. 10 (4): 383–388. doi:10.1214/aoms/1177732151.
- Fisher, R. A. (1939). "Selective Forces in Wild Populations of Paratettix texanus". Annals of Eugenics. 9 (2): 109–122. doi:10.1111/j.1469-1809.1939.tb02201.x. hdl:2440/15128.
- Fisher, R. A. (1939). "The Comparison of Samples with Possibly Unequal Variances". Annals of Eugenics. 9 (2): 174–180. doi:10.1111/j.1469-1809.1939.tb02205.x. hdl:2440/15235.
- Fisher, R. A. (1939). "The Sampling Distribution of Some Statistics Obtained From Non-linear Equations". Annals of Eugenics. 9 (3): 238–249. doi:10.1111/j.1469-1809.1939.tb02211.x. hdl:2440/15236.
- Fisher, R. A. (1939). "Student". Annals of Eugenics. 9: 1–9. doi:10.1111/j.1469-1809.1939.tb02192.x.
- "The Galton Laboratory". Science. 90 (2341): 436. 1939. Bibcode:1939Sci....90Q.436.. doi:10.1126/science.90.2341.436.
- (with EB Ford and J Huxley) Fisher, R. A.; Ford, E. B.; Huxley, Julian (1939). "Taste-testing the Anthropoid Apes". Nature. 144 (3652): 750. Bibcode:1939Natur.144..750F. doi:10.1038/144750a0. hdl:2440/15129. S2CID 4136526.

=== 1940s ===
- Fisher, R. A. (1940). "On the Similarity of the Distributions Found For the Test of Significance in Harmonic Analysis". Annals of Eugenics. 10: 14–17. doi:10.1111/j.1469-1809.1940.tb02233.x. hdl:2440/15238.
- Fisher, R. A. (1940). "The Precision of Discriminant Functions". Annals of Eugenics. 10: 422–429. doi:10.1111/j.1469-1809.1940.tb02264.x. hdl:2440/15240.
- Fisher, R. A. (1940). "An Examination of the Different Possible Solutions of a Problem in IncompleteBlocks". Annals of Eugenics. 10: 52–75. doi:10.1111/j.1469-1809.1940.tb02237.x. hdl:2440/15239.
- Fisher, R. A. (1940). "The Galton Laboratory". Science. 91 (2350): 44–45. Bibcode:1940Sci....91...44F. doi:10.1126/science.91.2350.44-a. PMID 17776669. S2CID 45838757.
- (with GL Taylor) Fisher, R. A.; Taylor, G. L. (1940). "Scandinavian Influence in Scottish Ethnology". Nature. 145 (3676): 590. Bibcode:1940Natur.145..590F. doi:10.1038/145590a0. hdl:2440/15131. S2CID 4109720.
- Fisher, R. A. (1941). "The Asymptotic Approach to Behren's Integral, with Further Tables for the d Test of Significance". Annals of Eugenics. 11: 141–172. doi:10.1111/j.1469-1809.1941.tb02281.x. hdl:2440/15241.
- Fisher, R. A. (1941). "The Negative Binomial Distribution". Annals of Eugenics. 11: 182–187. doi:10.1111/j.1469-1809.1941.tb02284.x. hdl:2440/15242.
- Fisher, R. A. (1941). "Average Excess and Average Effect of a Gene Substitution". Annals of Eugenics. 11: 53–63. doi:10.1111/j.1469-1809.1941.tb02272.x. hdl:2440/15133.
- Fisher, R. A. (1941). "The Interpretation of Experimental Four-fold Tables". Science. 94 (2435): 210–211. Bibcode:1941Sci....94..210F. doi:10.1126/science.94.2435.210. hdl:2440/15243. PMID 17776206. S2CID 9795962.
- Fisher, R. A. (1942). "The Theory of Confounding in Factorial Experiments in Relation to the Theory of Groups". Annals of Eugenics. 11: 341–353. doi:10.1111/j.1469-1809.1941.tb02298.x. hdl:2440/15244.
- Fisher, R. A. (1942). "Some Combinatorial Theorems and Enumerations Connected with the Numbers of Diagonal Types of a Latin Square". Annals of Eugenics. 11: 395–401. doi:10.1111/j.1469-1809.1941.tb02302.x. hdl:2440/15245.
- Fisher, R. A. (1942). "New Cyclic Solutions to Problems in incomplete Blocks". Annals of Eugenics. 11: 290–299. doi:10.1111/j.1469-1809.1941.tb02291.x.
- Fisher, R. A. (1942). "The Likelihood Solution of a Problem in Compounded Probabilities". Annals of Eugenics. 11: 306–307. doi:10.1111/j.1469-1809.1941.tb02293.x.
- Fisher, R. A. (1942). "Completely Orthogonal 9 × 9 Squares – a Correction". Annals of Eugenics. 11: 402–403. doi:10.1111/j.1469-1809.1941.tb02303.x.
- (with WRG Atkins) "The therapeutic Use of Vitamin C". Journal of the Royal Army Medical Corps. 83: 251–252. 1943.
- "A Theoretical Distribution for the Apparent Abundance of Different Species". Journal of Animal Ecology. 12: 54–58. 1943.
- Fisher, R. A. (1943). "Note on Dr. Berkson's Criticism of Tests of Significance". Journal of the American Statistical Association. 38 (221): 103–104. doi:10.1080/01621459.1943.10501783. hdl:2440/15247.
- Fisher, R. A. (1943). "A System of Confounding for Factors with More Than Two Alternatives, Giving Completely Orthogonal Cubes and Higher Powers". Annals of Eugenics. 12: 283–290. doi:10.1111/j.1469-1809.1943.tb02332.x. hdl:2440/15249.
- "The Therapeutic Use of Vitamin C". Journal of the Royal Army Medical Corps. 83: 251–252. 1944.
- Fisher, R. A. (1945). "A New Test for 2 × 2 Tables". Nature. 156 (3961): 388. Bibcode:1945Natur.156..388F. doi:10.1038/156388a0. hdl:2440/15252. S2CID 4113420.
- MARTIN L (1945). "The Hereditary and Familial Aspects of Exophthalmic Goitre and Nodular Goitre". Quarterly Journal of Medicine. 14: 207–219. PMID 21011421.
- "The Logical Inversion of the Notion of the Random Variable". Sankhya. 7: 129–132. 1945.
- "Recent Progress in Experimental Design". 1945.
- Fisher, R. A. (1946). "Testing the Difference Between Two Means of Observations of Unequal Precision". Nature. 158 (4020): 713–714. Bibcode:1946Natur.158..713F. doi:10.1038/158713b0. S2CID 4137422.
- FISHER RA (1947). "The Rhesus Factor : A Study in Scientific Method". American Scientist. 35 (1): 95–103. PMID 20282984.
- Fisher, R. A. (1947). "The analysis of Covariance Method for the Relation Between a Part and the Whole". Biometrics. 3 (2): 65–68. doi:10.2307/3001641. hdl:2440/15253. JSTOR 3001641. PMID 20255205.
- Fisher, R A; Ford, E B (1947). "The Spread of a Gene in Natural Conditions in a Colony of the Moth Panaxia Dominula L". Heredity. 1 (2): 143–174. doi:10.1038/hdy.1947.11. hdl:2440/15137.
- Fisher, R A; Lyon, M F; Owen, A R G (1947). "The Sex Chromosome in the House Mouse". Heredity. 1 (3): 355–365. doi:10.1038/hdy.1947.23. hdl:2440/15138.
- "The renaissance of Darwinism". Listener. 37: 1001. 1947.
- Fisher, R. A. (1947). "The Theory of Linkage in Polysomic Inheritance". Philosophical Transactions of the Royal Society B. 233 (594): 55–87. Bibcode:1947RSPTB.233...55F. doi:10.1098/rstb.1947.0006. hdl:2440/15135.
- "Development of the Theory of Experimental Design". Proceedings of the International Statistical Conferences. 3: 434–439. 1947.
- "Conclusions fiduciaires". Annales de l'Institut Henri Poincaré. 10: 191–213. 1948.
- Fisher, R. A. (1948). "Biometry". Biometrics. 4 (3): 217–219. JSTOR 3001567. PMID 18098453.
- Fisher, R. A.; Snell, G. D. (1948). "A Twelfth Linkage Group of the House Mouse". Heredity. 2 (Pt 2): 271–273. doi:10.1038/hdy.1948.16. hdl:2440/15139. PMID 18890162.
- "What Sort of Man is Lysenko?". Listener. 40: 874–875. 1948.
- Mosteller, Frederick; Fisher, R. A. (1948). "Answer to Question 14 on Combining independent tests of significance". The American Statistician. 2 (5): 30–31. doi:10.2307/2681650. JSTOR 2681650.
- Fisher, R. A. (1949). "A Biological Assay of Tuberculins". Biometrics. 5 (4): 300–316. doi:10.2307/3001513. hdl:2440/15259. JSTOR 3001513. PMID 15397310.
- Fisher RA; Bailey NT (1949). "Note on the Test of Significance for Differential Viability in Frequency Data from a Complete Three-Point Test". Heredity. 3: 215–219. doi:10.1038/hdy.1949.13. PMID 18143388.
- Fisher, R A (1949). "A Preliminary Linkage Test with Agouti and Undulated Mice". Heredity. 3 (2): 229–241. doi:10.1038/hdy.1949.16. hdl:2440/15143. PMID 18149092.
- Dowdeswell, W. H.; Fisher, R. W.; Ford, E. B. (1949). "The Quantitative Study of Populations in the Lepidoptera 2 Maniola Jurtina L". Heredity. 3 (Pt. 1): 67–84. doi:10.1038/hdy.1949.3. PMID 18119999.
- Fisher, R. A. (1949). "The Linkage Problem in a Tetrasomic Wild Plant, Lythrum Salicaria". Proceedings of the 8th International Congress of Genetics (Supplement to Hereditas). 35: 225–233. doi:10.1111/j.1601-5223.1949.tb03335.x. hdl:2440/15144.

=== 1950s ===
- Fisher, R. A. (1950). "The Significance of Deviations From Expectation in a Poisson Series". Biometrics. 6 (1): 17–24. doi:10.2307/3001420. hdl:2440/15260. JSTOR 3001420.
- Fisher, R. A. (1950). "Gene Frequencies in a Cline Determined by Selection and Diffusion". Biometrics. 6 (4): 353–361. doi:10.2307/3001780. hdl:2440/15146. JSTOR 3001780. PMID 14791572.
- Fisher, R. A.; Ford, E B (1950). "The "Sewall Wright Effect"". Heredity. 4 (1): 117–119. doi:10.1038/hdy.1950.8. PMID 15415009.
- Fisher, R. A. (1950). "A Class of Enumerations of Importance in Genetics". Proceedings of the Royal Society B. 136 (885): 509–520. Bibcode:1950RSPSB.136..509F. doi:10.1098/rspb.1950.0002. hdl:2440/15145. PMID 15400439. S2CID 37395283.
- Fisher, R. A. (1951). "Answer to Query 91 on interaction of quantity and quality in agricultural field trials". Biometrics. 7 (4): 433–434. doi:10.2307/3001657. JSTOR 3001657.
- Fisher, R. A. (1951). "Standard Calculations for Evaluating a Blood-Group System". Heredity. 5 (1): 95–102. doi:10.1038/hdy.1951.5. hdl:2440/15149. PMID 14840760.
- Fisher, R. A. (1952). "Sequential Experimentation". Biometrics. 8 (3): 183–187. doi:10.2307/3001546. hdl:2440/15263. JSTOR 3001546.
- Fisher, R. A. (1952). "Statistical Methods in Genetics". Heredity. 6: 1–12. doi:10.1038/hdy.1952.1. hdl:2440/15150.
- Bliss, C. I.; Fisher, R. A. (1953). "Note on the Efficient Fitting of the Negative Binomial". Biometrics. 9 (2): 197–199. doi:10.2307/3001850. JSTOR 3001850.
- Fisher, Ronald (1953). "The Variation in Strength of the Human Blood Group P". Heredity. 7: 81–89. doi:10.1038/hdy.1953.7. hdl:2440/15152.
- Fisher, Ronald (1953). "The Linkage of Polydactyly with Leaden in the House-Mouse". Heredity. 7: 91–95. doi:10.1038/hdy.1953.8. hdl:2440/15153.
- "The Expansion of Statistics". Journal of the Royal Statistical Society, Series A. 116 (1): 1–10. 1953. doi:10.2307/2980946. hdl:2440/15266. JSTOR 2980946.
- Fisher, R. (1953). "Dispersion on a Sphere". Proceedings of the Royal Society A. 217 (1130): 295–305. Bibcode:1953RSPSA.217..295F. doi:10.1098/rspa.1953.0064. hdl:2440/15264. S2CID 123166853.
- Fisher, R. (1953). "Population Genetics The Croonian Lecture, 1953". Proceedings of the Royal Society B. 141 (905): 510–523. Bibcode:1953RSPSB.141..510F. doi:10.1098/rspb.1953.0058. PMID 13100409. S2CID 85157766.
- Fisher, Ronald (1954). "The Analysis of Variance with Various Binomial Transformations". Biometrics. 10 (1): 130–139. doi:10.2307/3001667. hdl:2440/15267. JSTOR 3001667.
- Fisher, Ronald A (1954). "A Fuller Theory of "Junctions" in Inbreeding". Heredity. 8 (2): 187–197. doi:10.1038/hdy.1954.17. hdl:2440/15155.
- "Contribution to a Discussion of a Paper on Interval Estimation by M.A. Creasy". Journal of the Royal Statistical Society, Series B. 16: 212–213. 1954.
- "Statistical Methods and Scientific induction". Journal of the Royal Statistical Society, Series B. 17: 69–78. 1955.
- Fisher, R. A. (1955). "Answer to Query 114 on the effect of errors of grouping in an analysis of variance". Biometrics. 11 (2): 237–238. doi:10.2307/3001800. JSTOR 3001800.
- "New Tables of Behrens' Test of Significance". Journal of the Royal Statistical Society, Series B. 18: 212–216. 1956.
- "On a Test of Significance in Pearson's Biometrika Tables (No. 11)". Journal of the Royal Statistical Society, Series B. 18: 56–60. 1956.
- "Comment on the Notes by Neyman, Bartlett, and Welch". Journal of the Royal Statistical Society, Series B. 19: 179. 1957.
- "The Underworld of Probability". Sankhya. 18: 201–210. 1957.
- Fisher, R. A. (1957). "Dangers of Cigarette-Smoking". British Medical Journal. 2 (5039): 297–298. doi:10.1136/bmj.2.5039.297-b. PMC 1961712.
- Fisher, Ronald A. (1958). "Lung Cancer and Cigarettes?". Nature. 182 (4628): 108. Bibcode:1958Natur.182..108F. doi:10.1038/182108a0. PMID 13566198. S2CID 4222105.
- Fisher, R. A. (1958). "Cancer and Smoking". Nature. 182 (4635): 596. Bibcode:1958Natur.182..596F. doi:10.1038/182596a0. PMID 13577916. S2CID 4172653.
- "Polymorphism and Natural Selection". Bulletin de l'Institut International de Statistique. 36: 284–289. 1958.
- "The Nature of Probability". Centennial Review. 2: 261–274. 1958.
- "The Discontinuous Inheritance". The Listener. 60: 85–87. 1958.
- "Natural Selection from the Genetical Standpoint". Australian Journal of Science. 22: 16–17. 1959.
- "Cigarettes, cancer, and statistics". Centennial Review. 2: 151–166. 1959.
- Fisher, Ronald A (1959). "An Algebraically Exact Examination of Junction Formation and Transmission in Parent-offspring Inbreeding". Heredity. 13 (2): 179–186. doi:10.1038/hdy.1959.21. hdl:2440/15159. S2CID 45516323.
- Fisher, Sir Ronald A. (1959). "Mathematical Probability in the Natural Sciences". Technometrics. 1: 21–29. doi:10.1080/00401706.1959.10489846. hdl:2440/15275.

=== 1960s ===
- "Scientific Thought and the Refinement of Human Reasoning". Journal of the Operations Research Society of Japan. 3. 1960.
- "On Some Extensions of Bayesian Inference Proposed by Mr. Lindley". Journal of the Royal Statistical Society, Series B. 22: 299–301. 1960.
- (with EA Cornish) Fisher, Sir Ronald A.; Cornish, E. A. (1960). "The Percentile Points of Distributions Having Known Cumulants". Technometrics. 2 (2): 209–225. doi:10.1080/00401706.1960.10489895. hdl:2440/15277. S2CID 120619706.
- Fisher, RA (1961). "Possible Differentiation in the Wild Population of Oenothera Organesis". Australian Journal of Biological Sciences. 14: 76–78. doi:10.1071/BI9610076. hdl:2440/15160.
- Fisher, R (1961). "A Model for the Generation of Self-Sterility Alleles". Journal of Theoretical Biology. 1: 411–414. PMID 13893275.
- "The Weighted Mean of Two Normal Samples with Unknown Variance Ratio". Sankhya. 23: 103–114. 1961.
- "Sampling the Reference Set". Sankhya. 23. 1961.
- Fisher, Sir Ronald A. (1962). "Confidence Limits for a Cross-Product Ratio". Australian Journal of Statistics. 4: 41. doi:10.1111/j.1467-842X.1962.tb00285.x. hdl:2440/15284.
- "The Place of the Design of Experiments in the Logic of Scientific Inference". Colloques Internationaux du Centre National de la Recherche Scientifique: 13–19. 1962.
- Fisher, Ronald A. (1962). "Enumeration and Classification in Polysomic Inheritance". Journal of Theoretical Biology. 2 (3): 309–311. Bibcode:1962JThBi...2..309F. doi:10.1016/0022-5193(62)90033-4. hdl:2440/15162.
- "Self-Sterility Alleles: a Reply to Professor D Lewis". Journal of Theoretical Biology. 3: 146–147. 1962. doi:10.1016/s0022-5193(62)80011-3.
- Fisher, R.A. (1962). "The Detection of a Sex Difference in Recombination Values Using Double Heterozygotes". Journal of Theoretical Biology. 3 (3): 509–513. Bibcode:1962JThBi...3..509F. doi:10.1016/S0022-5193(62)80042-3. hdl:2440/15164.
- "The Simultaneous Distribution of Correlation Coefficients". Sankhya. 24. 1962.
- "Some Examples of Bayes' Method of the Experimental Determination of Probabilities a Priori". Journal of the Royal Statistical Society, Series B. 24: 118–124. 1962.
