= Thiele's interpolation formula =

In mathematics, Thiele's interpolation formula is a formula that defines a rational function $f(x)$ from a finite set of inputs $x_i$ and their function values $f(x_i)$. The problem of generating a function whose graph passes through a given set of function values is called interpolation. This interpolation formula is named after the Danish mathematician Thorvald N. Thiele. It is expressed as a continued fraction, where ρ represents the reciprocal difference:

$$f(x) = f(x_1) + \cfrac{x-x_1}{\rho(x_1,x_2) + \cfrac{x-x_2}{\rho_2(x_1,x_2,x_3) - f(x_1) + \cfrac{x-x_3}{\rho_3(x_1,x_2,x_3,x_4) - \rho(x_1,x_2) + \cdots}}}$$

Note that the $n$-th level in Thiele's interpolation formula is

$$\rho_n(x_1,x_2,\cdots,x_{n+1})-\rho_{n-2}(x_1,x_2,\cdots,x_{n-1})+\cfrac{x-x_{n+1}}{\rho_{n+1}(x_1,x_2,\cdots,x_{n+2})-\rho_{n-1}(x_1,x_2,\cdots,x_{n})+\cdots},$$

while the $n$-th reciprocal difference is defined to be

$$\rho_n(x_1,x_2,\ldots,x_{n+1})=\frac{x_1-x_{n+1}}{\rho_{n-1}(x_1,x_2,\ldots,x_{n})-\rho_{n-1}(x_2,x_3,\ldots,x_{n+1})}+\rho_{n-2}(x_2,\ldots,x_{n})$$.

The two $\rho_{n-2}$ terms are different and can not be cancelled.
