= The Lady Tasting Tea =

Book by David Salsburg about the history of modern statistics

- English edition
- Author: David Salsburg
- Language: English
- Subject: Statistics
- Genre: History of science and technology
- Publisher: Henry Holt and Company
- Publication date: May 1, 2002
- Publication place: USA
- Media type: Print (paperback)
- Pages: 352 pages
- ISBN: 0-8050-7134-2

The Lady Tasting Tea: How Statistics Revolutionized Science in the Twentieth Century (ISBN 0-8050-7134-2) is a book by David Salsburg about the history of modern statistics and the role it played in the development of science and industry.

The title comes from the "lady tasting tea", an example from the famous book, The Design of Experiments, by Ronald A. Fisher. Regarding Fisher's example, the statistician Debabrata Basu wrote that "the famous case of the 'lady tasting tea'" was "one of the two supporting pillars [...] of the randomization analysis of experimental data".

== Summary ==
The book discusses the statistical revolution which took place in the twentieth century, where science shifted from a deterministic view (Clockwork universe) to a perspective concerned primarily with probabilities and distributions and parameters. Salsburg does this through a collection of stories about the people who were fundamental in the change, starting with men like R.A. Fisher and Karl Pearson. He discusses at length how many of these people had their own philosophy of statistics, and in particular their own understanding of statistical significance. Throughout, he introduces in a very nontechnical fashion a variety of statistical ideas and methods, such as maximum likelihood estimation and bootstrapping.

== Reception ==
The book was generally well-received, receiving coverage in a variety of medical and statistical journals. Reviewers from the medical field enjoyed Salsburg's coverage of Fisher's opposition to early research on the health effects of tobacco. Critics disagreed with certain opinions that Salsburg voiced, like his barebones portrayal of Bayesian statistics and his seeming disdain for pure mathematics. Nevertheless, almost all reviewers appreciated the interesting read and recommended the book to people in their field as well as a general audience.

== List of scholars mentioned ==
The book discusses a wide variety of statisticians, mathematicians, as well as other scientists and scholars. This is a list of those mentioned, broken down into groups of chapters.

=== Chapters 1-9 ===
- Ronald Fisher
- H. Fairfield Smith
- Karl Pearson
- Francis Galton
- Pierre-Simon Laplace
- Jerzy Neyman
- Raphael Weldon
- Charles Darwin
- William Sealy Gosset
- Harald Cramér
- L. H. C. Tippett
- Emil Julius Gumbel
- Chester Bliss
- Jarl Waldemar Lindeberg
- Paul Lévy (mathematician)
- Nan Laird
- James H. Ware
- William Feller
- Abraham Wald
- Richard von Mises
- Emmy Noether
- Herman Otto Hartley
- Wassily Hoeffding
- Edward Norton Lorenz
- Henri Poincaré
- Egon Pearson
- Henri Lebesgue

=== Chapters 10-19 ===
- John Venn
- David Blackwell
- Elizabeth Scott (mathematician)
- Evelyn Fix
- Arthur Lyon Bowley
- Leonard Jimmie Savage
- Bruno de Finetti
- Thomas Bayes
- Frederick Mosteller
- David L. Wallace
- John Maynard Keynes
- Andrey Kolmogorov
- Norbert Wiener
- Aleksandr Khinchin
- Walter A. Shewhart
- Florence Nightingale
- Florence Nightingale David
- Andrey Markov
- Frank Wilcoxon
- Henry Mann
- Donald R. Whitney
- Nikolai Smirnov
- Jaroslav Hájek
- E. J. G. Pitman
- Raghu Raj Bahadur
- Prasanta Chandra Mahalanobis
- Samarendra Nath Roy
- C. R. Rao
- Raj Chandra Bose
- Pranab K. Sen
- Madan Lal Puri
- Margaret E. Martin
- Morris H. Hansen
- Nathan Mantel
- Jerome Cornfield
- George Gallup
- Louis H. Bean
- William Hurwitz
- Wassily Leontief
- Bertrand Russell
- Alfred North Whitehead
- Robert Koch
- Richard Doll
- Austin Bradford Hill
- Alvan Feinstein
- Ralph Horvitz
- Daniel Horn
- E. Cuyler Hammond
- Harold F. Dorn
- Joseph Berkson
- George W. Snedecor
- Gertrude Mary Cox
- William Gemmell Cochran
- Janet L. Norwood
- Nancy Mann
- Grace Wahba
- Yvonne Bishop
- Samuel S. Wilks
- R. I. Moore
- Everett Franklin Lindquist
- Harry C. Carver
- Joseph Wedderburn
- Hermann Weyl
- Kurt Gödel
- Solomon Lefschetz
- Luther P. Eisenhart
- Theodore Wilbur Anderson
- Alexander M. Mood
- Charles Winsor
- Richard Loree Anderson

=== Chapters 20-29 ===
- I. J. Good
- Persi Diaconis
- Richard E. Bellman
- John Tukey
- Stephen Stigler
- Albert A. Michelson
- Johannes Kepler
- George E. P. Box
- Bradley Efron
- David Cox
- W. Edwards Deming
- Stella Cunliffe
- Odd Aalen
- Per Kragh Andersen
- Richard D. Gill
- Richard A. Olshen
- Lee-Jen Wei
- Richard Peto
- Edmund A. Gehan
- Frank Anscombe
- Donald Rubin
- Guido Castelnuovo
- Corrado Gini
- Francesco Paolo Cantelli
- Abraham de Moivre
- Valery Glivenko
- Joan R. Rosenblatt
- Emanuel Parzen
- John Van Ryzin
- Bart Kosko
- Thomas Kuhn
- Adolphe Quetelet
- Laurence Jonathan Cohen
- Henry E. Kyburg Jr.
- Stephen Fienberg
- Samuel Krislov
- Daniel Kahneman
- Amos Tversky
- Patrick Suppes
