= Anders Hald =

Danish statistician (1913–2007)

Anders H. Hald
- Born: 3 July 1913
- Died: 11 November 2007 (aged 94)
- Scientific career
- Fields: Statistics
- Institutions: University of Copenhagen
- Doctoral advisor: Georg Rasch

Anders Hjorth Hald (3 July 1913 – 11 November 2007) was a Danish statistician. He was a professor at the University of Copenhagen from 1960 to 1982. While a professor, he did research in industrial quality control and other areas, and also authored textbooks. After retirement, he made important contributions to the history of statistics.

Hald was a Fellow of the American Statistical Association, a Member of the Royal Danish Academy of Science and Letters, a Member of the Institute of Mathematical Statistics, an Honorary Fellow of the Royal Statistical Society, and a Corresponding Fellow of the Royal Society of Edinburgh.

== Bibliography ==
- A History of Parametric Statistical Inference from Bernoulli to Fisher, 1713–1935. New York: Springer. 2007. ISBN 978-0-387-46408-4.
- A History of Probability and Statistics and Their Applications before 1750. Hoboken, NJ: Wiley. 2003. ISBN 0-471-47129-1.
- A History of Mathematical Statistics from 1750 to 1930. New York: Wiley. 1998. ISBN 0-471-17912-4.
- Statistical theory of sampling inspection by attributes. London: Academic Press. 1981. ISBN 0-12-318350-2.
- Statistical Theory with Engineering Applications. New York: Wiley. 1952.
- Statistical Tables and Formulas. New York: Wiley. 1952.
- "T. N. Thiele's contributions to statistics", International Statistical Review, 49, number 1 (1981): 1–20. (Reprinted in Steffen L. Lauritzen, ed. (2002). Thiele: Pioneer in Statistics. Oxford University Press.)
- "The early history of the cumulants and the Gram–Charlier series", International Statistical Review, 68, number 2 (2000): 137–153. (Reprinted in Steffen L. Lauritzen, ed. (2002). Thiele: Pioneer in Statistics. Oxford University Press.)

=== In Danish ===
- Statistiske Metoder, 1949
- Statistisk Kvalitetskontrol, 1954
- Statistiske Metoder i Arbejdsstudierteknikken, 1955
- Elementær Lærebog i Statistisk Kvalitetskontrol, 1956
