= Lady tasting tea =

Famous randomized experiment

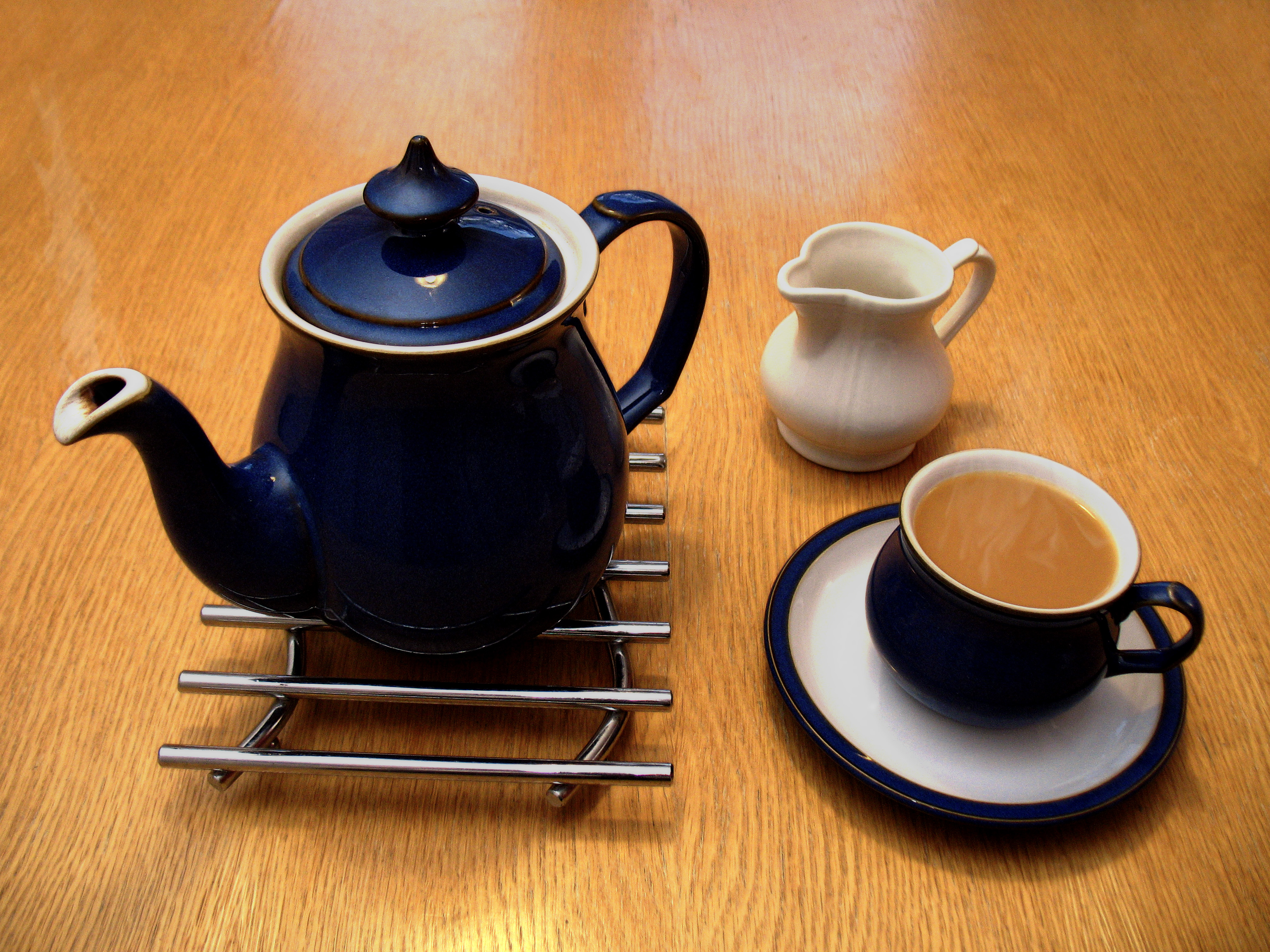
The experiment asked whether a taster could tell if the milk was added before the brewed tea, when preparing a cup of tea.

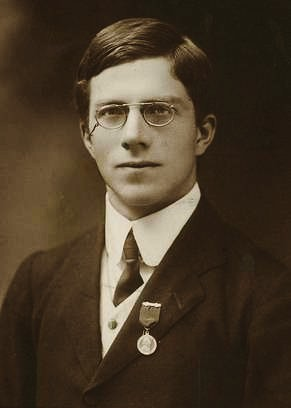
Ronald Fisher in 1913

In the design of experiments in statistics, the lady tasting tea is a randomized experiment devised by Ronald Fisher and reported in his book The Design of Experiments (1935). The experiment is the original exposition of Fisher's notion of a null hypothesis, which is "never proved or established, but is possibly disproved, in the course of experimentation".

The example is loosely based on an event in Fisher's life. The woman in question, phycologist Muriel Bristol, claimed to be able to tell whether the tea or the milk was added first to a cup. Her future husband, William Roach, suggested that Fisher give her eight cups, four of each variety, in random order. One could then ask what the probability was for her getting the specific number of cups she identified correct (in fact all eight), but just by chance.

Fisher's description is less than 10 pages in length and is notable for its simplicity and completeness regarding terminology, calculations and design of the experiment. The test used was Fisher's exact test.

== The experiment ==
The experiment provides a subject with eight randomly ordered cups of tea – four prepared by pouring milk and then tea, four by pouring tea and then milk. The subject attempts to select the four cups prepared by one method or the other, and may compare cups directly against each other as desired. The method employed in the experiment is fully disclosed to the subject.

The null hypothesis is that the subject has no ability to distinguish the teas. In Fisher's approach, there was no alternative hypothesis, unlike in the Neyman–Pearson approach.

The test statistic is a simple count of the number of successful attempts to select the four cups prepared by a given method. The distribution of possible numbers of successes, assuming the null hypothesis is true, can be computed using the number of combinations. Using the combination formula, with $n=8$ total cups and $k=4$ cups chosen, there are
$$\binom{8}{4} = \frac{8!}{4!(8-4)!} = 70$$
possible combinations.

Tea-Tasting Distribution Assuming the Null Hypothesis
Success count	Combinations of selection	Number of Combinations
0	oooo	$$1 \times 1=1$$ $$\binom{4}{0}\times\binom{4}{4}$$
1	ooox, ooxo, oxoo, xooo	$$4 \times 4=16$$ $$\binom{4}{1}\times\binom{4}{3}$$
2	ooxx, oxox, oxxo, xoxo, xxoo, xoox	$$6 \times 6=36$$ $$\binom{4}{2}\times\binom{4}{2}$$
3	oxxx, xoxx, xxox, xxxo	$$4 \times 4=16$$ $$\binom{4}{3}\times\binom{4}{1}$$
4	xxxx	$$1 \times 1=1$$ $$\binom{4}{4}\times\binom{4}{0}$$
Total		70

The frequencies of the possible numbers of successes, given in the final column of this table, are derived as follows. For 0 successes, there is clearly only one set of four choices (namely, choosing all four incorrect cups) giving this result. For one success and three failures, there are four correct cups of which one is selected, which by the combination formula can occur in $\binom 41 =4$ different ways (as shown in column 2, with x denoting a correct cup that is chosen and o denoting a correct cup that is not chosen); and independently of that, there are four incorrect cups of which three are selected, which can occur in $\binom 43 = 4$ ways (as shown in the second column, this time with x interpreted as an incorrect cup which is not chosen, and o indicating an incorrect cup which is chosen). Thus a selection of any one correct cup and any three incorrect cups can occur in any of 4×4 = 16 ways. The frequencies of the other possible numbers of successes are calculated correspondingly. Thus the number of successes is distributed according to the hypergeometric distribution. Specifically, for a random variable $X$ equal to the number of successes, we may write $X \sim \operatorname{Hypergeometric}(N=8,K=4,n=4)$, where $N$ is the population size or total number of cups of tea, $K$ is the number of success states in the population or four cups of either type, and $n$ is the number of draws, or four cups. The distribution of combinations for making k selections out of the 2k available selections corresponds to the kth row of Pascal's triangle, such that each integer in the row is squared. In this case, $k = 4$ because 4 teacups are selected from the 8 available teacups.

The critical region for rejection of the null of no ability to distinguish was the single case of 4 successes of 4 possible, based on the conventional probability criterion < 5%. This is the critical region because under the null of no ability to distinguish, 4 successes has 1 chance out of 70 (≈ 1.4% < 5%) of occurring, whereas at least 3 of 4 successes has a probability of (16+1)/70 (≈ 24.3% > 5%).

Thus, if and only if the lady properly categorized all 8 cups was Fisher willing to reject the null hypothesis – effectively acknowledging the lady's ability at a 1.4% significance level (but without quantifying her ability). Fisher later discussed the benefits of more trials and repeated tests.

David Salsburg reports that a colleague of Fisher, H. Fairfield Smith, revealed that in the actual experiment the lady succeeded in identifying all eight cups correctly. The chance of someone who just guesses of getting all correct, assuming she guesses that any four had the tea put in first and the other four the milk, would be only 1 in 70 (the combinations of 8 taken 4 at a time).

== The Lady Tasting Tea book ==
David Salsburg published a popular science book entitled The Lady Tasting Tea, which describes Fisher's experiment and ideas on randomization. Deb Basu wrote that "the famous case of the 'lady tasting tea'" was "one of the two supporting pillars ... of the randomization analysis of experimental data."

== See also ==
- Permutation test
- Random assignment
- Randomization test
- Binomial distribution
