= Thorvald N. Thiele =

Danish astronomer

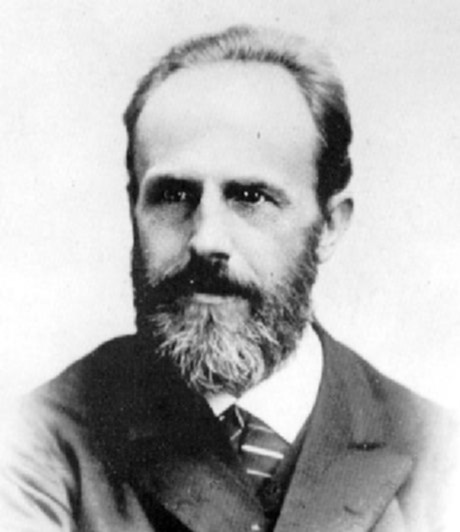
- Born: 24 December 1838; Copenhagen
- Died: 26 September 1910 (aged 71)
- Education: University of Copenhagen
- Known for: Cumulant; Thiele's voting rules Thiele's interpolation formula
- Scientific career
- Fields: Astronomy, Statistics
- Workplaces: Copenhagen Observatory
- Doctoral advisor: Heinrich Louis d'Arrest

Thorvald Nicolai Thiele (24 December 1838 – 26 September 1910) was a Danish astronomer and director of the Copenhagen Observatory. He was also an actuary and mathematician, most notable for his work in statistics, interpolation and the three-body problem.

Thiele made notable contributions to the statistical study of random time series and introduced the cumulants and likelihood functions, and was considered to be one of the greatest statisticians of all time by Ronald Fisher. In the early 1900s he also developed and proposed a generalisation of approval voting to multiple winner elections called sequential proportional approval voting, which was briefly used for party lists in Sweden when proportional representation was introduced in 1909.

Thiele also was a founder and Mathematical Director of the Hafnia Insurance Company and led the founding of the Danish Society of Actuaries. It was through his insurance work that he came into contact with fellow mathematician Jørgen Pedersen Gram.

Thiele was the father of astronomer Holger Thiele.

The main-belt asteroids 843 Nicolaia (discovered by his son Holger) and 1586 Thiele are named in his honour.

== Selected publications ==
- Sur la compensation de quelques erreurs quasi-systématiques par la méthode des moindres carrés. 1880.
- Theory of observations. 1903.
- Interpolationsrechnung. 1909.

== See also ==
- Founders of statistics
- Brownian motion
- Kalman filter
- Stochastic process

== Notes and references ==
=== References ===
- Steffen L. Lauritzen (2002). Thiele: Pioneer in Statistics. Oxford University Press. p. 288. ISBN 978-0-19-850972-1.
  - 1. Introduction to Thiele, S. L. Lauritzen
  - 2. On the application of the method of least squares to some cases, in which a combination of certain types of inhomogeneous random sources of errors gives these a 'systematic' character, T. N. Thiele
  - 3. Time series analysis in 1880: a discussion of contributions made by T. N. Thiele, S. L. Lauritzen
  - 4. The general theory of observations: calculus of probability and the method of least squares, T. N. Thiele
  - 5. T. N. Thiele's contributions to statistics, A. Hald
  - 6. On the halfinvariants in the theory of observations, T. N. Thiele
  - 7. The early history of cumulants and the Gram–Charlier series, A. Hald
  - 8. Epilogue, S. L. Lauritzen
- Anders Hald (1998). A History of Mathematical Statistics from 1750 to 1930. New York: Wiley. ISBN 978-0-471-17912-2.
- Anders Hald. "T. N. Thiele's contributions to statistics" International Statistical Review volume 49, (1981), number 1: 1—20.
- Anders Hald. "The early history of the cumulants and the Gram–Charlier series" International Statistical Review volume 68 (2000), number 2,´: 137—153.
- Steffen L. Lauritzen. "Time series analysis in 1880. A discussion of contributions made by T.N. Thiele". International Statistical Review 49, 1981, 319–333.
- Steffen L. Lauritzen, Aspects of T. N. Thiele’s Contributions to Statistics. Bulletin of the International Statistical Institute, 58, 27–30, 1999.
