= Reciprocal difference =

In mathematics, the reciprocal difference of a finite sequence of numbers $(x_0, x_1, ..., x_n)$ on a function $f(x)$ is defined inductively by the following formulas:

$$\rho_1(x_1, x_2) = \frac{x_1 - x_2}{f(x_1) - f(x_2)}$$

$$\rho_2(x_1, x_2, x_3) = \frac{x_1 - x_3}{\rho_1(x_1, x_2) - \rho_1(x_2, x_3)} + f(x_2)$$

$$\rho_n(x_1,x_2,\ldots,x_{n+1})=\frac{x_1-x_{n+1}}{\rho_{n-1}(x_1,x_2,\ldots,x_{n})-\rho_{n-1}(x_2,x_3,\ldots,x_{n+1})}+\rho_{n-2}(x_2,\ldots,x_{n})$$

== See also ==
- Divided differences
