= Statistical Methods for Research Workers =

1925 statistics book by Ronald Fisher

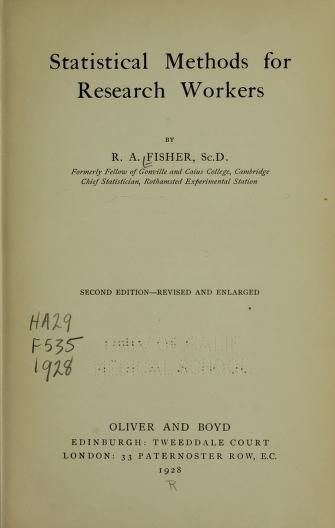
- Author: R. A. Fisher
- Publisher: Oliver and Boyd
- Publication date: 1925

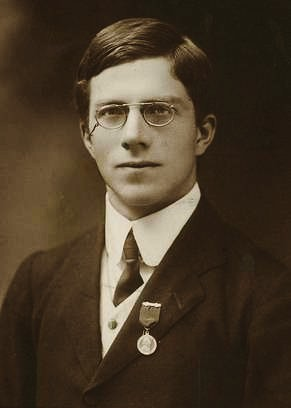
Ronald Fisher

Statistical Methods for Research Workers is a classic book on statistics, written by the statistician R. A. Fisher. It is considered by some to be one of the 20th century's most influential books on statistical methods, together with his The Design of Experiments (1935). It was originally published in 1925, by Oliver & Boyd (Edinburgh); the final and posthumous 14th edition was published in 1970. The impulse to write a book on the statistical methodology he had developed came not from Fisher himself but from D. Ward Cutler, one of the two editors of a series of "Biological Monographs and Manuals" being published by Oliver and Boyd.

== Reviews ==
According to Denis Conniffe:

Ronald A. Fisher was "interested in application and in the popularization of statistical methods and his early book Statistical Methods for Research Workers, published in 1925, went through many editions and motivated and influenced the practical use of statistics in many fields of study. His Design of Experiments (1935) [promoted] statistical technique and application. In that book he emphasized examples and how to design experiments systematically from a statistical point of view. The mathematical justification of the methods described was not stressed and, indeed, proofs were often barely sketched or omitted altogether ..., a fact which led H. B. Mann to fill the gaps with a rigorous mathematical treatment in his well-known treatise, Mann (1949)."

According to Erich L. Lehmann:

Even reviewers who were not offended by Fisher's attack on traditional methods found much to criticize. In particular, they complained about Fisher's dogmatism, the lack of proofs, the emphasis on small samples, and the difficulty of the book. However, a review by Harold Hotelling, which was submitted to the Journal of the American Statistical Association in 1927, did justice to Fisher's achievement. Hotelling stated in his review that "most books on statistics consist of pedagogic rehashes of identical material. This comfortably orthodox subject matter is absent from the volume under review, which summarizes for the reader the author's independent codification of statistical theory and some of his brilliant contributions to the subject, not all of which have previously been published".

== Chapters ==
- Prefaces
1. Introduction
2. Diagrams
3. Distributions
4. Tests of Goodness of Fit, Independence and Homogeneity; with table of χ^{2}
5. Tests of Significance of Means, Difference of Means, and Regression Coefficients
6. The Correlation Coefficient
7. Intraclass Correlations and the Analysis of Variance
8. Further Applications of the Analysis of Variance
- SOURCES USED FOR DATA AND METHODS INDEX

In the second edition of 1928 a chapter 9 was added: The Principles of Statistical Estimation.

== See also ==
- The Design of Experiments

== Notes ==
- Mann, H. B. (1949). Analysis and design of experiments: Analysis of variance and analysis of variance designs. New York, N. Y.: Dover Publications, Inc. pp. x+195. MR 0032177.
