= The Correlation between Relatives on the Supposition of Mendelian Inheritance =

1918 scientific article by Ronald Fisher

- Author: Ronald Fisher
- Language: English
- Subject: Quantitative genetics
- Publication date: 1918
- Publication place: United States

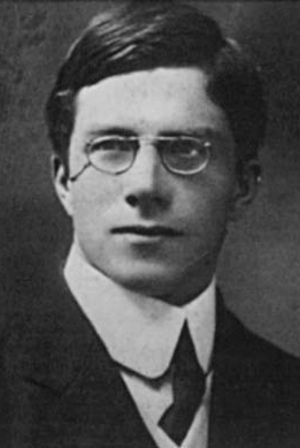
Ronald Fisher in 1912

The Correlation between Relatives on the Supposition of Mendelian Inheritance is a scientific paper by British statistician and geneticist Ronald Fisher which was published in the Transactions of the Royal Society of Edinburgh in 1918, marking a significant milestone in genetics. In this study, Fisher integrated Mendel's principles of inheritance with statistical techniques to clarify how characteristics could manifest as both continuous (such as height or weight) and still be regulated by distinct genetic factors. By closing this gap, Fisher demonstrated that the mixing patterns observed in complex traits could arise from the cumulative effects of numerous individual genes, all adhering to Mendelian principles. This link established the basis for contemporary quantitative genetics and assisted in merging biological inheritance with mathematical evaluation.

== Background ==
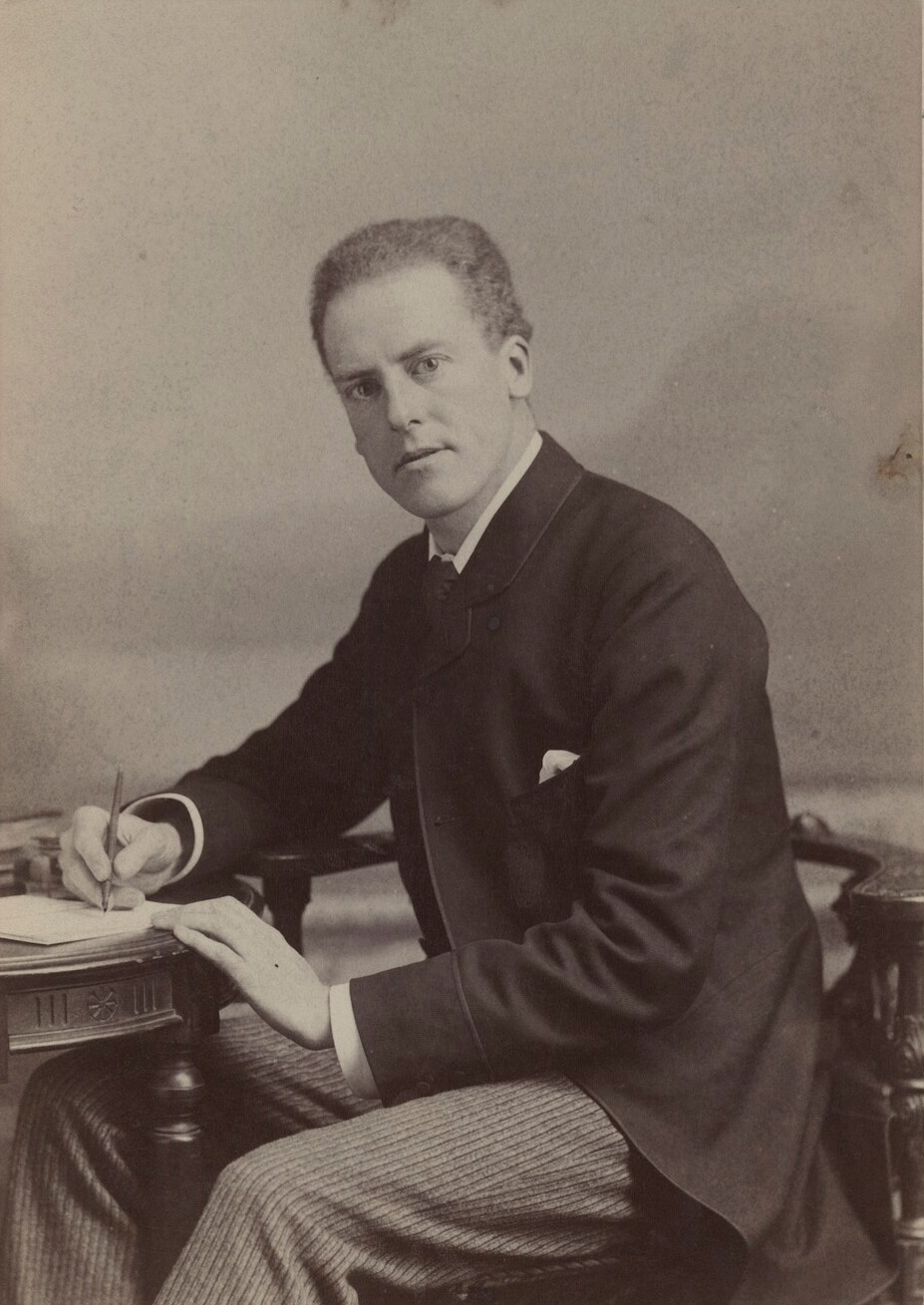
Karl Pearson

Mendelian inheritance was rediscovered in 1900. However, there were differences of opinion as to the variation that natural selection acted upon. The biometric school, led by Karl Pearson followed Charles Darwin's idea that small differences were important for evolution. The Mendelian school, led by William Bateson, however thought that Gregor Mendel's work gave an evolutionary mechanism with large differences. Joan Box, Fisher's biographer and daughter states in her 1978 book, The Life of a Scientist that Fisher, then a student, had resolved this problem in 1911.

Although Gregor Mendel demonstrated that plant traits were inherited in specific combinations, the first researcher to demonstrate that people inherit many physical attributes continuously was Francis Galton. Galton (1875) used statistical techniques he developed particularly correlation, regression, and variance to study similarities between relatives and to understand how much population differences were due to chance. He also used his statistical knowledge in genetics, and described heritability as something that can be measured using probability and distributions.

Later, Karl Pearson extended Galton's use of statistics in biology by developing the field of "biometry," which is the statistical examination of biological diversity. However, it would take another generation before Fisher (1918), synthesizing the earlier work of Mendel, Galton and Pearson, found a way to reconcile the earlier research into an overall theory of heredity. Fisher showed that if multiple genes were involved in the determination of a single trait, then continuous variation could result from the action of Mendelian genetics.

Fisher had originally submitted his paper (then entitled "The correlation to be expected between relatives on the supposition of Mendelian inheritance") to the Royal Society of London, to be published in their Transactions. The two referees, the biologist R. C. Punnett and the statistician Karl Pearson, believed that the paper contained areas they were unable to judge, due to lack of expertise, and expressed some reservations. Though the paper was not rejected, Fisher carried on a feud with Pearson from 1917 onwards, and instead sent the paper via J. Arthur Thomson to the Royal Society of Edinburgh, which published it in its Transactions.

== Before Fisher ==
In the late nineteenth and early twentieth centuries, the foundations of modern quantitative genetics were established by scientists who aimed to describe heredity through mathematics. Francis Galton (1887) was among the first to apply statistical reasoning to heredity and variation. Studying human traits such as height, Galton introduced the correlation coefficient to measure resemblance between relatives and developed the idea of "regression toward the mean," the observation that offspring of extreme parents tend to be closer to the population average. His work provided the first quantitative framework for studying heredity, though it lacked a genetic mechanism to explain the biological causes of these correlations.

Karl Pearson, one of Galton's students, extended this statistical approach by refining methods of correlation and regression. Between 1895 and 1909, he created a mathematical model of inheritance based on continuous variation, which later became central to what historians call the biometric tradition. Although Pearson and his collaborator W. F. R. Weldon were aware of Mendel's work, they considered Mendelian inheritance too simple to account for the complexity of most traits. Pearson's models could accurately describe variation but not its genetic basis. His view of heredity was one of blending parental influences rather than discrete, particulate inheritance.

Later scholarship has shown that the divide between the Mendelian and biometric traditions was not as rigid as once thought. Researchers such as Pearson were already exploring ways to connect statistical and genetic ideas. Early genetics represented a spectrum of approaches rather than a strict opposition between two schools of thought. This intellectual diversity, ranging from Galton's descriptive statistics to Pearson's mathematical formalism, provided the groundwork for Ronald A. Fisher, who would later unite Mendelian genetics with biometry. Fisher's synthesis formed the theoretical basis of population genetics and the study of quantitative traits.

== Fisher's 1918 paper ==
In 1918, Ronald A. Fisher published The Correlation Between Relatives on the Supposition of Mendelian Inheritance in the Transactions of the Royal Society of Edinburgh. The paper had initially been submitted to the Royal Society of London but was rejected after critical reviews from several members of the biometric school. Fisher's analysis resolved the long-standing dispute between biometricians and Mendelians by demonstrating that continuous variation could emerge naturally from Mendelian inheritance if a trait were influenced by many genes of small effect.

In this work, Fisher introduced the statistical concept of variance as a way to quantify variability within a population. He showed that total phenotypic variance could be separated into two main components: genetic variance, resulting from inherited factors, and environmental variance, resulting from non-genetic influences. This idea became central to the emerging field of quantitative genetics. By defining variance and its additive properties, Fisher laid the foundation for modern approaches to estimating heritability and predicting how traits respond to natural or artificial selection.

Fisher also derived equations to predict correlations between relatives, including parent–offspring, sibling, and cousin relationships, based on their expected genetic relatedness. These models accounted for the observed resemblance among family members as an outcome of Mendelian segregation across many loci of small effect. His framework formalized the now-standard approach to modeling inheritance through additive genetic variance, dominance effects, and environmental variation, creating a comprehensive statistical view of heredity.

The influence of this paper extended beyond genetics. The concept of variance as an additive measure became one of the most widely used tools in statistics. Fisher's work bridged the empirical correlations established by Galton and Pearson with the genetic mechanisms described by Mendel. By transforming heredity from a descriptive field into a predictive, quantitative science, Fisher established a model that became a cornerstone of population genetics and linked Darwinian evolution with Mendelian inheritance.

== Modern extensions and relevance ==
The theoretical framework Fisher developed in 1918 continues to form the foundation of modern quantitative and population genetics. His formulation of additive genetic variance remains central to understanding how complex traits evolve and respond to selection. The infinitesimal model, derived from Fisher's work, assumes that quantitative traits are influenced by a very large number of loci, each contributing a small effect, and that these effects combine additively. This model predicts that, under Mendelian inheritance, the distribution of phenotypic values in a population will be approximately normal, even when the underlying genes act discretely. This statistical property allows for powerful predictions about genetic resemblance among relatives and provides a bridge between classical inheritance and continuous trait variation.

Modern research has refined and extended Fisher's framework to account for greater biological complexity. Recent studies have incorporated dominance effects (interactions between alleles at the same locus) into the infinitesimal model, demonstrating that its predictions remain robust even when genetic interactions are considered. When traits are influenced by a large number of loci, both the shared genetic components within families and the random deviations due to Mendelian segregation converge toward normal distributions. These extensions preserve the usefulness of Fisher's approach while increasing its realism in modeling polygenic traits.

The same mathematical principles Fisher introduced are now used to interpret data from genome-wide association studies (GWAS), which examine how thousands of genetic variants influence quantitative traits. GWAS results have confirmed Fisher's original insight that most heritable variation in complex traits arises from numerous alleles of small effect. This finding has reinforced the relevance of additive models in modern genomics, showing that Fisher's assumptions about the genetic basis of continuous variation remain valid more than a century later. GWAS-based heritability estimates and polygenic risk scores both depend on Fisher's variance-partitioning framework, which distinguishes additive from environmental sources of variation.

Beyond genomics, Fisher's approach continues to shape the analysis of heritable disease, behavioral traits, and agricultural breeding programs. Variance-component models, derived directly from his 1918 paper, remain the foundation for estimating heritability in complex systems. These models separate total phenotypic variance into additive, non-additive (dominance or epistatic), and environmental components, providing insight into both evolutionary dynamics and applied genetics. The same logic is used in medical genetics to quantify the relative influence of genes and environment on conditions such as diabetes, heart disease, and psychiatric disorders.

The continued refinement of Fisher's ideas demonstrates how flexible his theoretical framework remains. Recent philosophical and historical studies emphasize that early genetic debates, once portrayed as a sharp divide between Mendelians and biometricians, actually laid the groundwork for today's integrative models. Fisher's synthesis succeeded because it reconciled these two perspectives, creating a model that could adapt to new discoveries. The enduring influence of the infinitesimal model, and of Fisher's variance-based reasoning, shows that his insights continue to guide both theoretical genetics and large-scale genomic analysis in the twenty-first century.

== Legacy and impact ==
Fisher's 1918 paper is widely regarded as one of the foundational works of modern population genetics and quantitative genetics. By mathematically reconciling Mendelian inheritance with the continuous variation observed by biometricians, Fisher bridged the gap between classical genetics and evolutionary biology.

The paper introduced the concept of additive genetic variance, a key idea that allowed scientists to separate genetic and environmental contributions to traits. This model became the statistical basis for estimating heritability and inspired methods such as the analysis of variance (ANOVA), which Fisher developed in later work.

Together with the contributions of Sewall Wright and J. B. S. Haldane, Fisher's work helped establish the modern synthesis—the integration of Mendelian genetics with Darwinian evolution. Its influence continues in fields such as biostatistics, animal breeding, and modern genomics, particularly in genome-wide association studies (GWAS).
