= David Salsburg =

American statistician (born 1931)

David S. Salsburg (born 1931) is an American author. His 2002 book The Lady Tasting Tea, subtitled How Statistics Revolutionized Science in the Twentieth Century, provides a layman's overview of important developments in the field of statistics in the late 19th and early 20th century, particularly in the areas of experiment design, the study of random distributions, and the careers of major researchers in the field such as Ronald Fisher, Karl Pearson, and Jerzy Neyman.

Salsburg is a retired pharmaceutical company statistician (having been a senior research fellow at Pfizer's central research department until 1995) who has taught at Harvard, Yale, Connecticut College, the University of Connecticut, the University of Pennsylvania, Rhode Island College, and Trinity College and has been a Fellow of the American Statistical Association since 1978. Salsburg was also the first statistician hired by Pfizer. In 1994, Salsburg was awarded the Career Achievement Award of the Biostatistics Section of the Pharmaceutical Research and Manufacturers of America, given annually for "significant contributions to the advancement of biostatistics in the pharmaceutical industry". The Mathematical Association of America characterised him as follows

"Salsburg believes that the public is not fully aware of the degree to which recent developments in statistics impact the way we perceive the world. He correctly points out that the twentieth century saw the fading of a deterministic outlook and the rise of a statistical/probabilistic way of looking at the world. This ongoing revolution is not only in the physical sciences, it also touches the social sciences and even the humanities. Though profound, it is a quiet revolution that has been unnoticed by many."

Salsburg's most recent book, Errors, Blunders and Lies: How to Tell the Difference was published in 2017.

== Publications ==
1. Understanding Randomness: Exercises for Statisticians (Lecture Notes in Statistics) (1983)
2. Statistics for Toxicologists (Drug and Chemical Toxicology) (1986)
3. The Use of Restricted Significance Tests in Clinical Trials (Statistics for Biology and Health) (1992)
4. The Lady Tasting Tea: How Statistics Revolutionized Science in the Twentieth Century (2002)
5. When the Band has Ceased to Play, American Presidents after Leaving Office (2013)
6. Jonah in the Garden of Eden: a statistical investigation of the Hebrew Bible (2013)
7. Love Feeds Among the Lilies (2013)
8. Errors, Blunders and Lies: How to Tell the Difference (ASA-CRC Series on Statistical Reasoning in Science and Society) (2017)
