= Omnigenic model =

Model of genetic architecture of complex traits

The Omnigenic Model, first proposed by Evan A. Boyle, Yang I. Li, and Jonathan K. Pritchard, describes a hypothesis regarding the heritability of complex traits. Expanding beyond polygenes, the authors propose that all genes expressed within a cell affect the expression of a given trait. In addition, the model states that the peripheral genes, ones that do not have a direct impact on expression, explain more heritability of traits than core genes, ones that have a direct impact on expression. The process that the authors propose that facilitates this effect is called "network pleiotropy", in which peripheral genes can affect core genes, not by having a direct effect, but rather by virtue of being mediated within the same cell.

== History ==
The proposed Omnigenic Model is type of non-mendellian inheritance that builds off of previous research regarding the Polygenic Model and Fisher's Infinitesimal Model. Under the Polygenic Model, for traits, like height, to be continuous in a population there must be many genes that code for the trait. Otherwise, the expression of the trait is limited by the number of possible combinations of alleles. The many genes which code for the continuous trait are also further modified by environmental conditions.

Similar to Fisher's Infinitesimal Model, the Omnigenic Model proposes that as the number of genes that code for a trait increases, the total amount of heritability each gene explains decreases. However, in the case of the Omnigenic Model, genes are organized into two groups – core and peripheral genes. Core genes are the relatively few genes that directly impact trait expression and peripheral genes have non-direct effects on core genes. Core genes may have large detectable effects on trait heritability; however, core genes explain less heritability than peripheral genes, as their small effects greatly outnumber the core genes. The identification and distinctions between core and peripheral genes are still being investigated.

The Omnigenic hypothesis has broad implications for the field of genetics, especially regarding the effectiveness of Genome-wide Association Studies (GWAS) in detecting genetic variants that are predictive of disease. GWAS detect genetic variants that predict the incidence of a disease. For example, GWAS have identified genetic variants that are responsible for 10% of the heritability of Type II diabetes. Under the Omnigenic Model, these detected variants may not be as important as other peripheral gene effects. The Omnigenic hypothesis may also explain why the significant genetic variants detected by GWAS vary between populations, which complicates the usefulness of GWAS in clinical settings. Identification of core genes is still considered important to provide biological insights.

In 1999, Autism Spectrum Disorder (ASD) was determined to be a highly polygenic trait with more than 15 traits associated with its expression. This conclusion has been revisited and challenged in light of the formation of the Omnigenic Model. The current understanding of the disease has identified thousands of possible genes that affect the expression and severity of ASD; however, these genes act through similar pathways such as a deficit in neural development early in life.

== Evidence ==
The initial evidence proposed in support for the Omnigenic Model comes from two main components: the widespread effect of traits across the genome and the inability of cell-specific disease pathways to fully explain heritability. Genes that encode for continuous traits are found widely across the genome, with a gene that has a significant effect on trait expression occurring every 10,000-100,000 base pairs. The distance between these significant effects within the genome implies that these significant genes are not tied to similar regulatory pathways. Likewise, within some diseases, genes that are broadly found in all cells typically have stronger effects on heritability than genes expressed within cell-specific disease pathways.

Since this initial evidence, support for the Omnigenic Model has grown, especially with the documentation of trans-regulatory elements on gene expression. Trans-regulatory elements are DNA sequences that modify and regulate the expression of many distant genes. Evidence of trans-regulatory elements significantly impacting heritability builds support for a mechanism that which peripheral genes can impact trait expression and heritability.

Beyond humans, evidence for Omnigenic traits have been found across animals and plants. For example, the Eurasian Aspen, Populus tremula, has high variability in leaf shape across its range, but core genes that determine leaf shapes are unable to be identified using genome-wide association studies, which suggests that leaf shape is determined by many genes with small statistically insignificant effect sizes.

== Evolutionary Implications ==
The Omnigenic Model challenges modern efforts within evolutionary biology to identify traits that are responsible for adaption. Under the Omnigenic Model, trait adaptations that are a result of changes in a single to a few genes may be rare, instead the majority of trait adaptations may be driven by small changes in allele frequency over the whole genome. These small changes across the genome would add up to have profound effects on trait expression. Methods for detecting widespread gene expression adaptation have been developed and provide evidence that many adaptations are highly polygenic.
