= Rao–Sandelius shuffle =

Divide-and-conquer algorithm for generating a random permutation of a finite set

The Rao–Sandelius shuffle is a divide-and-conquer algorithm for shuffling a finite sequence. The algorithm takes a list of all the elements of the sequence, and for each element draws a uniform random value from 0 to k-1. The list is broken up into k subsequences by the random value chosen, which are further shuffled.

For an array with $n$ entries, the algorithm consumes $O(n \log n)$ random digits and performs $O(n \log n)$ swaps. This appears worse than the Fisher-Yates Shuffle, which consumes $O(n \log n)$ random digits and performs $O(n)$ swaps. However, because of the random access pattern of the Fisher-Yates shuffle, the Rao-Sandelius Shuffle can be faster for large $n$ due to its cache friendliness.

== Original method using random digit table ==
Rao described an algorithm for shuffling the numbers 1 through n using a table of random decimal digits. Sandelius described a procedure for shuffling a deck with n cards using random decimal digits. Sandelius includes the optimization that for a subdeck of length 2, you only need a single random digit. In the original, the order is kept for an odd random digit, and swapped for an even random digit. In either case the algorithm is as follows:

1. For each element to be shuffled, select a random digit 0 through 9.
2. Group elements that selected the same random digit into sub-lists.
3. Place the sub-lists in numerical order based on the digit selected.
4. Repeat on any sub-lists of size 2 or greater.

=== Length 2 optimization ===
Sandelius included the following optimization: If the sub-list is of length 2, draw a single random digit. Swap the order if the digit is even, and leave it unchanged if the digit is odd.

== Implementation with random bits ==
It is straightforward to adapt a version of this algorithm to a computer using k=2.

1. For each element to be shuffled, select a random bit.
2. Place all the elements that selected 0 ahead of all elements that selected 1.
3. Repeat on the 2 sub-lists. This step can be parallelized.

The Size-2 speedup can also be applied in this case. Preserving the order if 1 is chosen, and swapping if 0 is chosen.

Here is pseudocode for an in-place version of the algorithm (for a zero-based array):

function rs_shuffle(A, n):
    if n < 2 then return
    if n = 2 then:
        b ← uniform random bit
        if b = 0 then
            exchange A[0] and A[1]
            return
    rs_shuffle_large(A, n)

function rs_shuffle_large(A, n):
    front ← 0
    // Invariant 1: front is the index of the first
    // non-shuffled element
    back ← n - 1
    // Invariant 2: back is the index of the last
    // non-shuffled element
    outer: while true:
        b ← uniform random bit
        while b ≠ 1
            front ← front + 1
            if front > back then break outer
        // (*) front is now the index of an element
        // that belongs at the back.
        b ← uniform random bit
        while b ≠ 0
            back ← back - 1
            // Different due to (*) above
            if front ≥ back then break outer
        exchange A[front] and A[back]
        // Restore Invariant 1
        front ← front + 1
        // Restore Invariant 2
        back ← back - 1
        if front > back then break outer
    // Because the two halves are disjoint, these
    // two calls could be done in parallel
    rs_shuffle(A, front)
    rs_shuffle(A + front, n - front)

The above uses a variation on the Hoare partition scheme to reduce the average number of swaps.

Each algorithm pass is effectively an Inverse-GSR 2-shuffle.

== Performance ==
For large (e.g. $10^9$ items) data sets, the RS shuffle outperforms the more common Fisher-Yates Shuffle. It does this for two reasons:

1. It exhibits much better cache locality.
2. It is parallelizable. The Fisher-Yates shuffle is not.

Performance vs Fisher-Yates was measured by the authors of the MergeShuffle algorithm and by the authors of the VarPhilox GPU Shuffle
