= Sir Ronald Fisher window =

Stained glass window commemorating Sir Ronald Fisher

Coordinates: 52°12′23″N 0°06′59″E

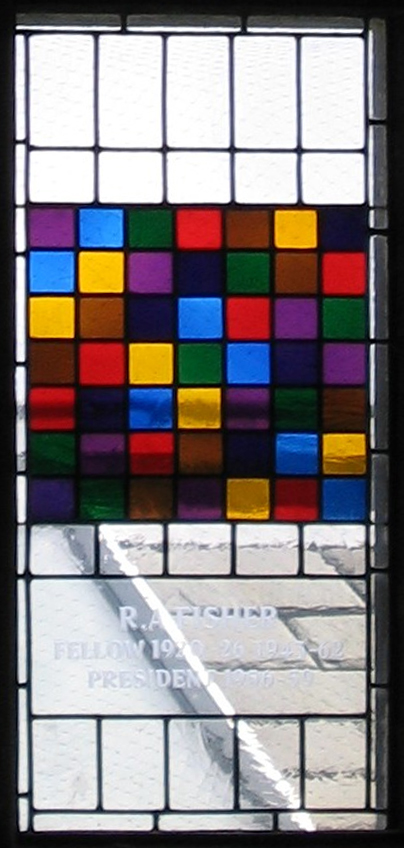
Stained glass window formerly in the dining hall of Caius College, Cambridge, commemorating Ronald Fisher and representing a Latin square

A stained glass window commemorating British statistician, geneticist, and eugenicist R. A. Fisher was installed in the dining hall of Gonville and Caius College in Cambridge, England in 1989. It depicts a 7x7 Latin square, as featured in Fisher's The Design of Experiments. The idea for the window came from a college fellow, A. W. F. Edwards, and the execution was the work of Maria McClafferty.

At first there were two windows, the other featuring a Venn diagram to commemorate John Venn, both installed in time for the 1990 centenary of Fisher's birth. In 1992, the set was expanded with four more windows representing scientific achievements with links to the college: a DNA spiral celebrating Francis Crick, and windows celebrating Charles Scott Sherrington, George Green and James Chadwick.

In June 2020, during the global George Floyd protests, the college's Gate of Honour was spray-painted in protest at the installation and at Fisher's association with eugenics, and the college announced on 24 June that the window would be removed because of Fisher's tarnished reputation. The removal was subsequently carried out.

The issue of the Fisher window will continue to be addressed in a working group and a public conference organized by the college to consider wider issues of diversity and representation.

== Criticism ==
Critics have pointed out that the principles applied in this case, if applied consistently, might justify the removal of memorials to other prominent figures such as John Maynard Keynes, an economist and co-founder of Cambridge Eugenics Society.
