= Fisher's z-distribution =

Statistical distribution

Fisher's z
- Probability density function
- Parameters: $d_1>0,\ d_2>0$ deg. of freedom
- Support: $x \in (-\infty; +\infty)\!$
- PDF: $\frac{2d_1^{d_1/2}d_2^{d_2/2}}{B(d_1/2,d_2/2)}\frac{e^{d_1x}}{\left(d_1e^{2x}+d_2\right)^{\left(d_1+d_2\right)/2}}\!$
- Mode: $0$

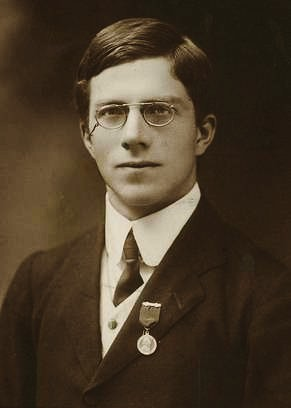
Ronald Fisher

Fisher's z-distribution is the statistical distribution of half the logarithm of an F-distribution variate:

$$z = \frac 1 2 \log F$$

It was first described by Ronald Fisher in a paper delivered at the International Mathematical Congress of 1924 in Toronto. Nowadays one usually uses the F-distribution instead.

The probability density function and cumulative distribution function can be found by using the F-distribution at the value of $x' = e^{2x} \,$. However, the mean and variance do not follow the same transformation.

The probability density function is

$$f(x; d_1, d_2) = \frac{2d_1^{d_1/2} d_2^{d_2/2}}{B(d_1/2, d_2/2)} \frac{e^{d_1 x}}{\left(d_1 e^{2 x} + d_2\right)^{(d_1+d_2)/2}},$$

where B is the beta function.

When the degrees of freedom becomes large ($d_1, d_2 \rightarrow \infty$), the distribution approaches normality with mean

$$\bar{x} = \frac 1 2 \left( \frac 1 {d_2} - \frac 1 {d_1} \right)$$

and variance

$$\sigma^2_x = \frac 1 2 \left( \frac 1 {d_1} + \frac 1 {d_2} \right).$$

== Related distribution ==
- If $X \sim \operatorname{FisherZ}(n,m)$ then $e^{2X} \sim \operatorname{F}(n,m) \,$ (F-distribution)
- If $X \sim \operatorname{F}(n,m)$ then $\tfrac{\log X}{2} \sim \operatorname{FisherZ}(n,m)$
