= Infinitesimal model =

Quantitative genetic model developed by Ronald Fisher in 1918

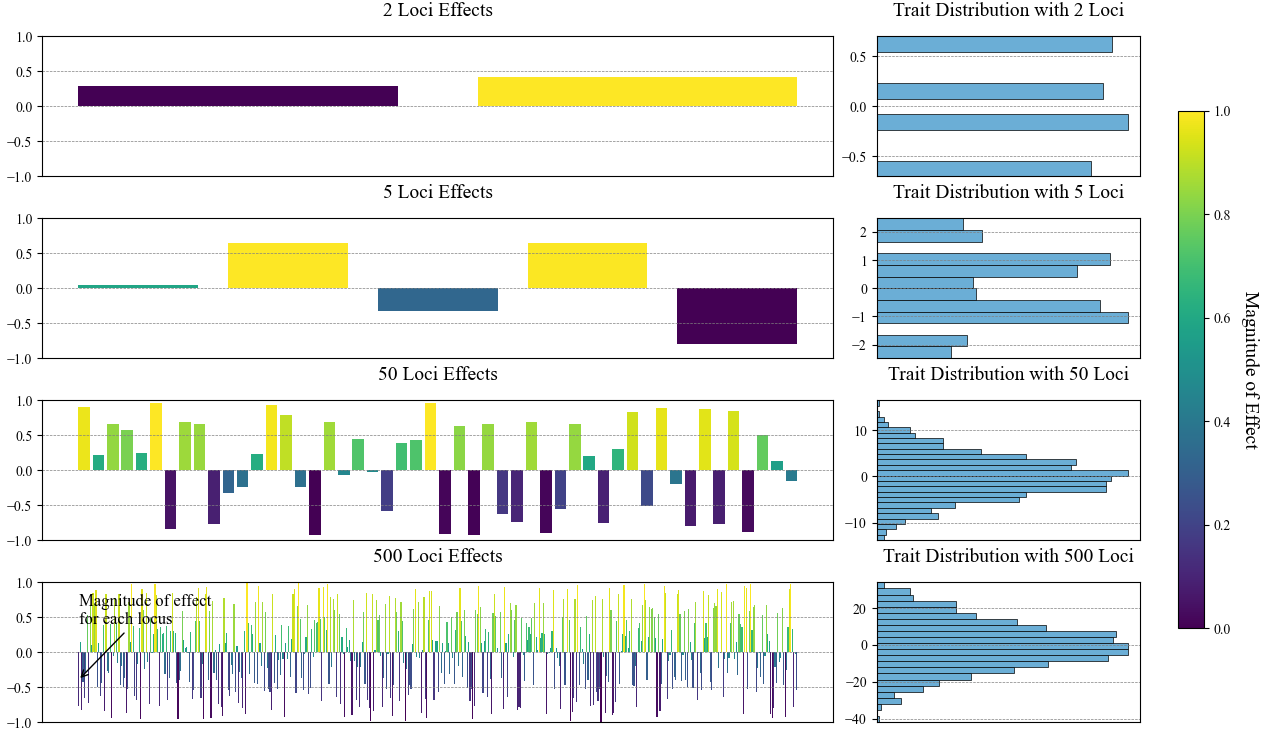

The infinitesimal model, also known as the polygenic model, is a widely used statistical model in quantitative genetics and in genome-wide association studies. Originally developed in 1918 by Ronald Fisher, it is based on the idea that variation in a quantitative trait is influenced by an infinitely large number of genes, each of which makes an infinitely small (infinitesimal) contribution to the phenotype, as well as by environmental factors. In "The Correlation between Relatives on the Supposition of Mendelian Inheritance", the original 1918 paper introducing the model, Fisher showed that if a trait is polygenic, "then the random sampling of alleles at each gene produces a continuous, normally distributed phenotype in the population". However, the model does not necessarily imply that the trait must be normally distributed, only that its genetic component will be so around the average of that of the individual's parents. The model served to reconcile Mendelian genetics with the continuous distribution of quantitative traits documented by Francis Galton.

The model allows genetic variance to be assumed to remain constant even when natural selection is occurring, because each locus makes an infinitesimal contribution to the variance. Consequently, all decline in genetic variance is assumed to be due to genetic drift. It also relies on the fact that there must be a large enough number of loci for the distribution of loci to be normal, an assumption which breaks down if a trait is influenced by a small number of loci. According to one research group, the model "…is obviously not an exact representation of the genome of any species," as humans do not have an infinite number of genes, "but is a useful assumption to make in genetic evaluation," such as "explaining the underlying variation of a trait." Some phenotypes undergo evolutionary adaptation such that they involve a modest number of loci of large effect. Complex traits, however, have been shown to be largely explained by additive effects, with dominance being of negligible importance, though dominance and epistasis are still relevant for rare Mendelian disorders.
