= Ebenezer Laing =

Ghanaian botanist and geneticist

Ebenezer Laing FGA, FAAS, OV
- Born: 28 June 1931; Cape Coast, Gold Coast
- Died: 19 April 2015 (aged 83); Accra, Ghana
- Education: Adisadel College; Achimota School
- Alma mater: University College of the Gold Coast / University of London (BSc); University of Cambridge (PhD)
- Known for: Pro-Vice Chancellor, University of Ghana, Legon; Contributions to science education and botany
- Scientific career
- Fields: Botany; Genetics
- Institutions: University of Ghana, Legon
- Doctoral advisor: Ronald Fisher

Ebenezer Laing, FGA, FAAS, OV (28 June 1931 – 19 April 2015) was a Ghanaian botanist and geneticist who served as the Pro-Vice Chancellor of the University of Ghana, Legon. He was a professor at the University of Ghana, Legon, and later an emeritus professor. Laing, together with his university and faculty colleague, George C. Clerk (1931–2019), was one of the first Ghanaian academics to specialise in botany as a scientific discipline and contributed significantly to the growth of the field in Ghana. He was also a Fellow of the Ghana Academy of Arts and Sciences, inducted in 1965. In 1985, he was elected an inaugural Fellow of the African Academy of Sciences.

== Early life and education ==
Ebenezer Laing was born in Cape Coast in the Central Region of Ghana on 28 June 1931. He was educated at the all-boys’ Anglican boarding school, Adisadel College and continued at Achimota School for sixth form. Between 1951 and 1954, he attended the University College of the Gold Coast, then an external affiliate of the University of London and obtained a bachelor's degree in botany with first-class honours. He was the recipient of the Basindale Prize for ranking second in his class. He proceeded to Corpus Christi College, a constituent college of the University of Cambridge where from 1954 to 1958, he earned a doctoral degree in Genetics as a student of Sir Ronald Fisher.

== Career ==
Ebenezer Laing was appointed a lecturer at the University of Ghana’s botany department and rose through the ranks to become a full professor. He later became the chairman of the botany department. His research was in plant genetics. He also served as the Hall Master of Legon Hall, of which he was an alumnus. Other senior administrative positions he held include the Dean of the Faculty of Science and the Pro-Vice Chancellor of the university. He was also an external examiner at other universities on the African continent. During his long teaching career, he had courtesy appointments at various departments at the University of Ghana including the Institute of African Studies, the Regional Institute for Population Studies, Department of Geography, Psychology Department, Department of Community Health at UGMS, Korle-Bu, School of Public Health as well as the Legon Centre for International Affairs and Diplomacy (LECIAD).

He was also a board member, advisor or consultant to several institutions: the Ghana Atomic Energy Commission, Ghana Academy of Arts and Sciences where he was elected a Fellow in 1965, the Council for Scientific and Industrial Research (CSIR), Cocoa Research Institute, the Volta Basin Research Project and the Population Dynamics Program at the University of Ghana, Legon. He was also a Founding Fellow of the African Academy of Sciences, elected in 1985. He also provided advisory services to the development of new higher education initiatives in both the public and private sector in Ghana. These include the University for Development Studies, the Presbyterian University College and the Anglican University College of Technology.

He was engaged in international work, among other designations as a member of the joint WHO/FAO/UNEP Panel of Experts on Environmental Management for Vector Control (PEEM) between 1981 and 1995. He co-chaired the ninth PEEM meeting at the World Health Organization in 1989, and was the national counterpart for the organization of the 1992 three-week Health Impact Assessment training course "Health Opportunities in Water Resources Development", held in Akosombo, Ghana.

== Personal life ==
He was married to Mildred Laing and had three children. He was an amateur photographer and a trained concert pianist with special interest in classical music from the Baroque and Romantic periods. An aficionado of Ghanaian music, he also played the classical guitar and the Oboe. Laing was also an accomplished organist for the Christ Anglican Church, Legon. Laing played tennis and was a technology-savvy biologist, taking up computer programming in his old age as a hobby.

== Death and legacy ==
He died in Accra on 19 April 2015 from natural causes. He was buried at the Osu Cemetery (previously known as Christiansborg Civil Cemetery) in Accra. The road behind the university’s department of botany was named in his honour.

== Awards and honours ==
- Honorary Doctor of Science (D. Sc.), University of Ghana, Legon
- Officer of the Order of the Volta, Government of Ghana
- Gold Medal, Distinguished Alumnus of Legon Hall
- Adisadel College Centenary Award - Distinguished Old Boy

== Books ==
- An introduction to modern genetics (1971)
- Genetic Demonstrations: Instructor's Manual (1980); co-authored with Marian Ewurama Addy and Carol Markwei
- A Geneticist's Apology: Thoughts on Genetics Teaching and Research (1985)
- The Council for Scientific and Industrial Research retrospect and prospects (1988)
- The New Biology: New Hope, New Threat Or New Dilemmas (1989)
- Science and society in Ghana (1990)
