= Cross Gramian =

In control theory, the cross Gramian ($W_X$, also referred to by $W_{CO}$) is a Gramian matrix used to determine how controllable and observable a linear system is.

For the stable time-invariant linear system

$$\dot{x} = A x + B u \,$$
$$y = C x \,$$

the cross Gramian is defined as:

$$W_X := \int_0^\infty e^{At} BC e^{At} dt \,$$

and thus also given by the solution to the Sylvester equation:

$$A W_X + W_X A = -BC \,$$

This means the cross Gramian is not strictly a Gramian matrix, since it is generally neither positive semi-definite nor symmetric.

The triple $(A,B,C)$ is controllable and observable, and hence minimal, if and only if the matrix $W_X$ is nonsingular, (i.e. $W_X$ has full rank, for any $t > 0$).

If the associated system $(A,B,C)$ is furthermore symmetric, such that there exists a transformation $J$ with

$$AJ = JA^T \,$$
$$B = JC^T \,$$

then the absolute value of the eigenvalues of the cross Gramian equal Hankel singular values:

$$|\lambda(W_X)| = \sqrt{\lambda(W_C W_O)}. \,$$

Thus the direct truncation of the Eigendecomposition of the cross Gramian allows model order reduction (see ) without a balancing procedure as opposed to balanced truncation.

The cross Gramian has also applications in decentralized control, sensitivity analysis, and the inverse scattering transform.

== See also ==
- Controllability Gramian
- Observability Gramian
