= Jørgen Pedersen Gram =

Danish actuary and mathematician (1850–1916)

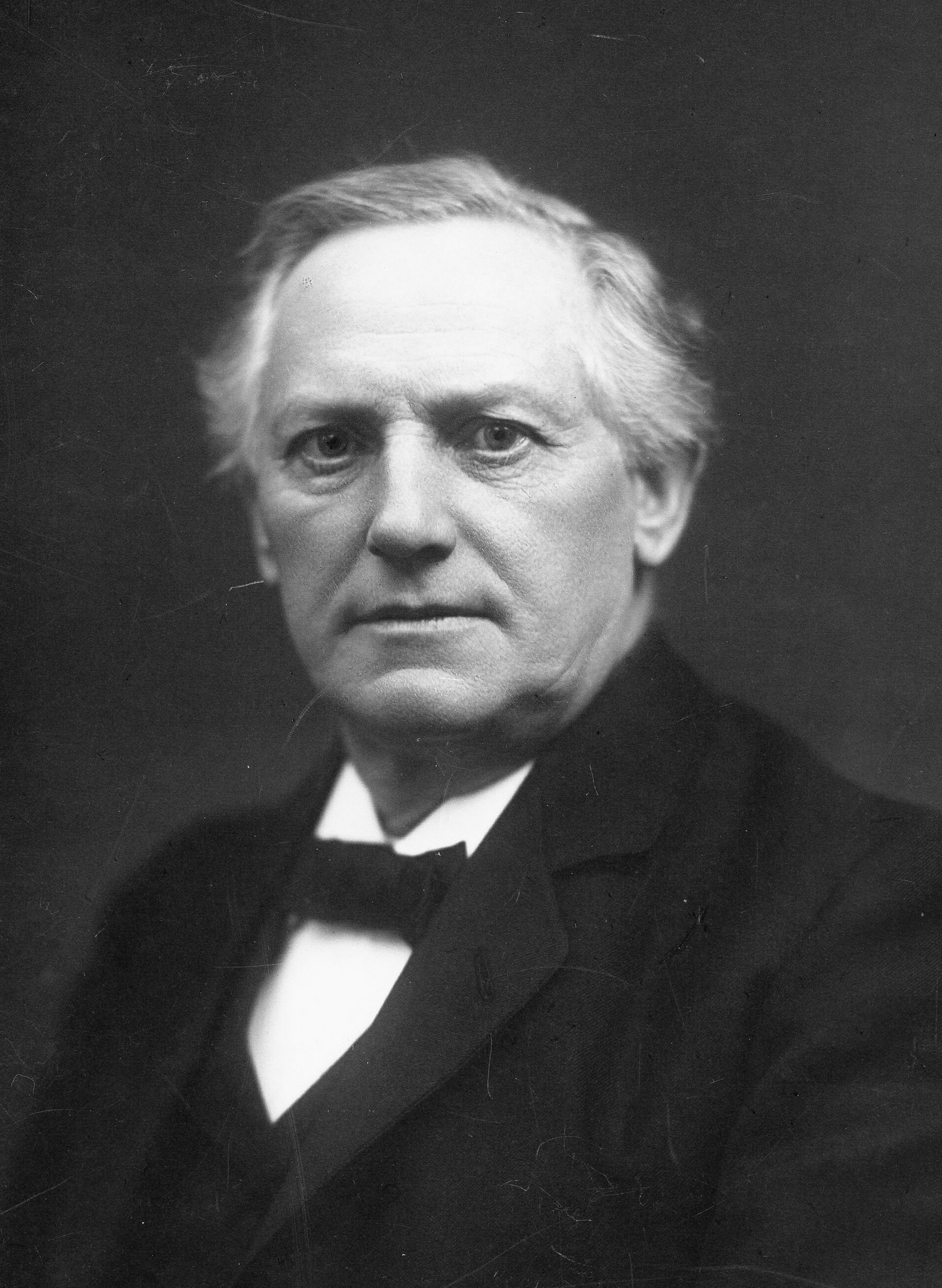
- Born: 27 June 1850; Nustrup, Duchy of Schleswig, Denmark
- Died: 29 April 1916 (aged 65); Copenhagen, Denmark
- Known for: Gram matrix Gram points Gram polynomials Gram's theorem Gram–Charlier A series Gram–Euler theorem Gram–Schmidt process

Jørgen Pedersen Gram (27 June 1850 – 29 April 1916) was a Danish actuary and mathematician who was born in Nustrup, Duchy of Schleswig, Denmark, and died in Copenhagen, Denmark.

Important papers of his include On series expansions determined by the methods of least squares, and Investigations of the number of primes less than a given number. The mathematical method that bears his name, the Gram–Schmidt process, was first published in the former paper, in 1883.

For number theorists his main fame is the series for the Riemann zeta function (the leading function in Riemann's exact prime-counting function). Instead of using a series of logarithmic integrals, Gram's function uses logarithm powers and the zeta function of positive integers. It has recently been supplanted by a formula of Ramanujan that uses the Bernoulli numbers directly instead of the zeta function.

In control theory, the Gramian or Gram matrix is an important contribution named after him. The Controllability Gramian and Observability Gramian are both important in the analysis of the stability of control systems. The Gram matrix is also important in deep learning, where it is used to represent the distribution of features in style transfer.

Gram was the first mathematician to provide a systematic theory of the development of skew frequency curves, showing that the normal symmetric Gaussian error curve was but one special case of a more general class of frequency curves.

Gram's theorem, the Gram–Charlier series, and Gram points are also named after him.

He died on his way to a meeting of the Royal Danish Academy after being struck by a cyclist.
