= Tilting =

Tilting may refer to:

- Tilt (camera), a cinematographic technique
- Tilting at windmills, an English idiom
- Tilting theory, an algebra theory
- Exponential tilting, a probability distribution shifting technique
- Tilting three-wheeler, a vehicle which leans when cornering while keeping all of its three wheels on the ground
- Tilting train, a train with a mechanism enabling increased speed on regular railroad tracks
- Tilting, Newfoundland and Labrador, a town on Fogo Island, Canada
- Tilting, a synonym for jousting
