= Gram's theorem =

In mathematics, Gram's theorem states that an algebraic set in a finite-dimensional vector space invariant under some linear group can be defined by absolute invariants. (Dieudonné & Carrell 1970, p. 31). It is named after J. P. Gram, who published it in 1874.
