= Marie Hankel =

German writer (1844–1929)

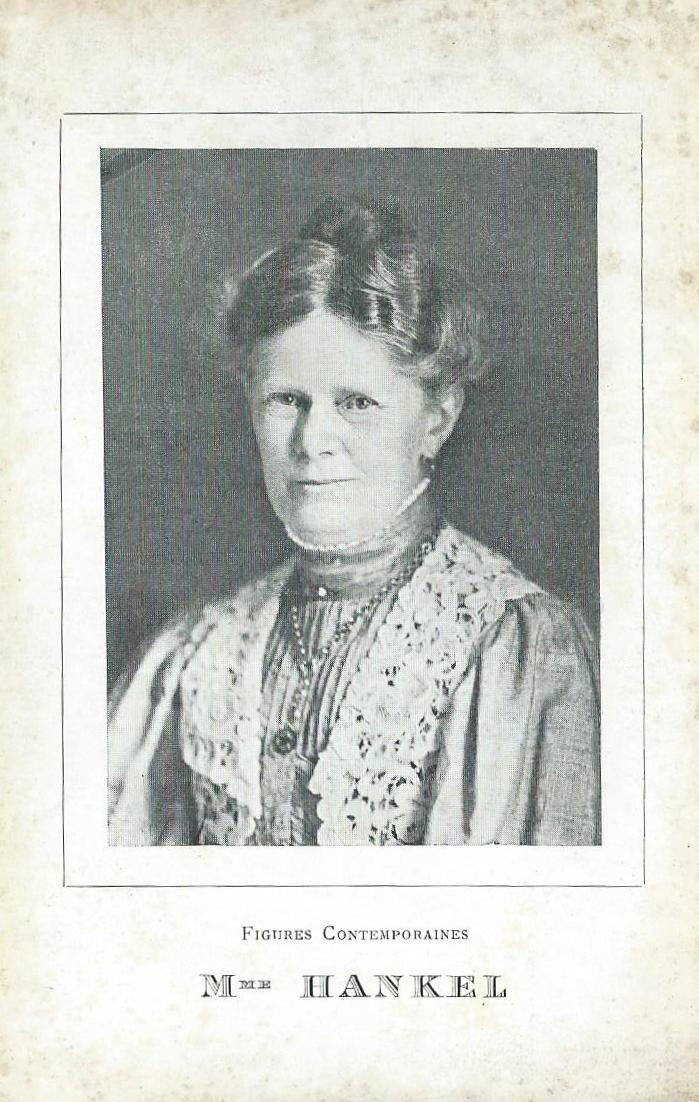
- Maria Hankel (photographed by Hugo Erfurth)
- Born: Marie Dippe; 1844; Schwerin, Germany
- Died: 1929 (aged 84–85)
- Occupations: Writer, translator
- Spouse: Hermann Hankel

Marie Hankel (née Dippe; 1844–1929) was a German writer of Esperanto literature. She is known for founding the Esperantista Literatura Asocio (Esperanto Literature Association) She also advocated for women's suffrage. She was married to the German mathematician Hermann Hankel.

== Life ==
Hankel née Dippe was born in 1844 in Schwerin, Germany. In 1905 she learned Esperanto and subsequently wrote poetry and prose in that language. Her titles include La simbolo de l' amo (The symbol of love), Tri unuaktaj komedioj (Three one-act comedies), and Sableroj (Sands). In 1909 she participated and won the literary contest Internaciaj Floraj Ludoj (International Floral Games). In 1910 she spoke in support of women's suffrage at the annual World Esperanto Congress in Washington, D.C. In 1911 she founded and became the first president of the Esperantista Literatura Asocio (Esperanto Literature Association) at that year's World Esperanto Congress in Antwerp.

Hankel died in 1929.

== Legacy ==
In 2003 a street in the Laubegast district in Dresden was named in her honor.
