= Internaciaj Floraj Ludoj =

The Internaciaj Floraj Ludoj (English: International Floral Games) were an annual Catalonia-based Esperanto literary contest inspired by the Barcelonan Floral Games. It was started by Frederic Pujulà i Vallès in 1908 from the drafts of Esperanto: La Revuo (The Journal) at the 5th annual World Congress of Esperanto. The first winner was the German poet Marie Hankel.

After its founding in 1910 by Federación Esperantista Catalana, the games were held by the Catalan Esperanto Congress. They soon gained participation and support. They are often held to be the most prestigious Esperanto event in the era before World War II.

Following the outbreak of the Spanish Civil War in 1936, the games ceased for 42 years until 1978, after the end of Francoist Spain. They ended entirely in 1993.

== Awards ==
The winners were awarded the Natural Flower. Winners who had participated in the games thrice were awarded the title of Master of the Floral Games. Some of the masters of the Floral Games were: Timothy Brian Carr, Bernard Golden, Giorgio Silfer and Krys Ungar.
