= Hermann Hankel =

German mathematician (1839–1873)

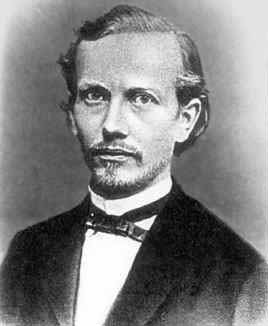
- Born: 14 February 1839; Halle, Germany
- Died: 29 August 1873 (aged 34); Schramberg, German Empire
- Education: Leipzig University
- Known for: Generalized Stokes theorem; Hankel contour; Hankel function; Hankel matrix; Hankel transform; Hankel singular value
- Spouse: Marie Hankel
- Father: Wilhelm Gottlieb Hankel
- Scientific career
- Fields: Mathematical analysis; Special functions
- Workplaces: Leipzig University; University of Erlangen–Nuremberg; University of Tübingen
- Thesis: Ueber eine besondere Classe der symmetrischen Determinanten (1861)

Hermann Hankel (14 February 1839 – 29 August 1873) was a German mathematician. Having worked on mathematical analysis during his career, he is best known for introducing the Hankel transform and the Hankel matrix.

== Biography ==
Hankel was born on 14 February 1839 in Halle, Germany. His father, Wilhelm Gottlieb Hankel, was a physicist. Hankel studied at Nicolai Gymnasium in Leipzig before entering Leipzig University in 1857, where he studied with Moritz Drobisch, August Ferdinand Möbius and his father. In 1860, he started studying at University of Göttingen, where he acquired an interest in function theory under the tutelage of Bernhard Riemann. Following the publication of an award winning article, he proceeded to study under Karl Weierstrass and Leopold Kronecker in Berlin. He received his doctorate in 1862 at Leipzig University. Receiving his teaching qualifications a year after, he was promoted to an associate professor at Leipzig University in 1867. At the same year, he received his full professorship in University of Erlangen–Nuremberg and spent his last four years in University of Tübingen. He died from an illness on 29 August 1873 in Schramberg, near Tübingen. He was married to Marie Hankel.

In 1867, he published Theorie der Complexen Zahlensysteme, a treatise on complex analysis. His works on the theory of functions include 1870's Untersuchungen über die unendlich oft oscillirenden und unstetigen functionen and his 1871 article “Grenze” for the Ersch-Gruber Encyklopädie. His work for Mathematische Annalen has highlighted the importance of Bessel functions of the third kind, which were later known as Hankel functions.

His 1867 exposition on complex numbers and quaternions is particularly memorable. For example, Fischbein notes that he solved the problem of products of negative numbers by proving the following theorem: "The only multiplication in R which may be considered as an extension of the usual multiplication in R^{+} by respecting the law of distributivity to the left and the right is that which conforms to the rule of signs." Furthermore, Hankel draws attention to the linear algebra that Hermann Grassmann had developed in his Extension Theory in two publications. This was the first of many references later made to Grassmann's early insights on the nature of space.

== Selected publications ==
- Hermann Hankel (1863) Die Euler'schen Integrale bei unbeschränkter Variabilität des Argumentes, Voss, Leipzig.
- Hankel, Hermann (1867). Vorlesungen über die complexen zahlen und ihre functionen ...: in zwei teilen (in German). Voss.
- Hermann Hankel (1869) Die Entwickelung der Mathematik in den letzten Jahrhunderten, Fues, Tübingen.
- Hermann Hankel (1870) Untersuchungen über die unendlich oft oscillirenden und unstetigen Functionen , Fues, Tübingen.
- Hermann Hankel (1874) Zur Geschichte der Mathematik in Alterthum und Mittelalter , Teubner, Leipzig.
- Hermann Hankel (1875) Die Elemente der projectivischen Geometrie in synthetischer Behandlung, Teubner, Leipzig.
