= Esscher transform =

In actuarial science, the Esscher transform (Gerber & Shiu 1994) is a transform that takes a probability density f(x) and transforms it to a new probability density f(x; h) with a parameter h. It was introduced by F. Esscher in 1932 (Esscher 1932).

== Definition ==
Let f(x) be a probability density. Its Esscher transform is defined as

$$f(x;h)=\frac{e^{hx}f(x)}{\int_{-\infty}^\infty e^{hx} f(x) \, dx}.\,$$

More generally, if μ is a probability measure, the Esscher transform of μ is a new probability measure E_{h}(μ) which has density

$$\frac{e^{hx}}{\int_{-\infty}^\infty e^{hx} \, d\mu(x)}$$

with respect to μ.

== Basic properties ==
Combination

The Esscher transform of an Esscher transform is again an Esscher transform: E_{h}_{_{1}} E_{h}_{_{2}} = E_{h}_{_{1} + h_{2}}.

Inverse

The inverse of the Esscher transform is the Esscher transform with negative parameter: E^{−1}_{h} = E_{−h}

Mean move

The effect of the Esscher transform on the normal distribution is moving the mean:

$$E_h(\mathcal{N}(\mu,\,\sigma^2)) =\mathcal{N}(\mu + h\sigma^2,\,\sigma^2).\,$$

== Examples ==
Distribution	Esscher transform
Bernoulli Bernoulli(p)	$k\mapsto\frac{e^{hk}p^k(1-p)^{1-k}}{1-p+pe^h} \text{ for } k = 0,1.$
Binomial B(n, p)	$k\mapsto\frac{{n\choose k}e^{hk}p^k(1-p)^{n-k}}{(1-p+pe^h)^n} \text{ for } k = 0,1,\ldots,n.$
Normal N(μ, σ^{2})	$x\mapsto\frac{1}{\sqrt{2 \pi \sigma^2}}e^{-\frac{(x-\mu-\sigma^2 h)^2}{2\sigma ^2}} \text{ for } x \text{ real.}$
Poisson Pois(λ)	$k\mapsto\frac{e^{hk-\lambda e^h}\lambda^k}{k!} \text{ for } k=0,1,2,\ldots\,.$

== Esscher principle ==
The Esscher principle is an insurance premium principle used in actuarial sciences that derives from the Esscher transform. It is given by $\pi[X,h]=E[Xe^{hX}]/E[e^{hX}]$, where $h$ is a strictly positive parameter. This premium is the net premium for a risk $Y=Xe^{hX}/m_X(h)$, where $m_X(h)$ denotes the moment generating function. This risk measure does not respect the positive homogeneity property of coherent risk measure for $h>0$.

== See also ==
- Exponential tilting
