= Minimum energy control =

In control theory, the minimum energy control is the control $u(t)$ that will bring a linear time invariant system to a desired state with a minimum expenditure of energy.

Let the linear time invariant (LTI) system be

$$\dot{\mathbf{x}}(t) = A \mathbf{x}(t) + B \mathbf{u}(t)$$
$$\mathbf{y}(t) = C \mathbf{x}(t) + D \mathbf{u}(t)$$

with initial state $x(t_0)=x_0$. One seeks an input $u(t)$ so that the system will be in the state $x_1$ at time $t_1$, and for any other input $\bar{u}(t)$, which also drives the system from $x_0$ to $x_1$ at time $t_1$, the energy expenditure would be larger, i.e.,

$$\int_{t_0}^{t_1} \bar{u}^*(t) \bar{u}(t) dt \ \geq  \ \int_{t_0}^{t_1} u^*(t) u(t) dt.$$

To choose this input, first compute the controllability Gramian

$$W_c(t)=\int_{t_0}^t e^{A(t-\tau)}BB^*e^{A^*(t-\tau)} d\tau.$$

Assuming $W_c$ is nonsingular (if and only if the system is controllable), the minimum energy control is then

$$u(t) = -B^*e^{A^*(t_1-t)}W_c^{-1}(t_1)[e^{A(t_1-t_0)}x_0-x_1].$$

Substitution into the solution

$$x(t)=e^{A(t-t_0)}x_0+\int_{t_0}^{t}e^{A(t-\tau)}Bu(\tau)d\tau$$

verifies the achievement of state $x_1$ at $t_1$.

== See also ==
- LTI system theory
- Control engineering
- State space (controls)
- Variational Calculus
