= Wilhelm Gottlieb Hankel =

Wilhelm Gottlieb Hankel (17 May 1814 – 18 February 1899) was a German physicist who was among the first to identify pyroelectric effects and the rotation of the plane of optical polarization in fluorspar upon application of electricity.

Hankel was born in Ermsleben at the base of the Harz mountains where his father was a cantor and teacher at a school. He enjoyed working with tools at a young age and became interested in mathematics at the Quedlinburg high school. He then went to the University of Halle to study theology but he moved to science and became an assistant to Johann Schweigger. He taught at the Francke Foundations in Halle after 1836, earning to support younger siblings after the death of both parents. He completed his doctorate in Halle on thermoelectricity in crystals and habilitated in 1840. He became an associated professor in Halle in 1847 and joined as a full professor at the University of Leipzig in 1849. Poor eyesight forced him to give up teaching but he continued to publish.

Hankel's major findings were that the phenomenon of pyroelectricity was not limited to crystals with asymmetries (hemimorphism). He published 30 papers on the topic of pyroelectricity. He also studied thermal effects on galvanic cells and took an interest in atmospheric electricity.

Hankel married the daughter of a farmer in 1838 and they had a son who became a noted mathematician Hermann Hankel (1839–1873). His wife died on the day of their 60th wedding anniversary and he died a year later.

== See also ==
- Physical crystallography before X-rays
