= Edgeworth series =

Infinite sum approximating a probability distribution in terms of its cumulants

In probability theory, the Gram–Charlier A series (named in honor of Jørgen Pedersen Gram and Carl Charlier), and the Edgeworth series (named in honor of Francis Ysidro Edgeworth) are series that approximate a probability distribution over the real line $(-\infty,\infty)$ in terms of its cumulants. The series are the same; but, the arrangement of terms (and thus the accuracy of truncating the series) differ. The key idea of these expansions is to write the characteristic function of the distribution whose probability density function f is to be approximated in terms of the characteristic function of a distribution with known and suitable properties, and to recover f through the inverse Fourier transform.

== Gram–Charlier A series ==
We examine a continuous random variable. Let $\hat{f}$ be the characteristic function of its distribution whose density function is f, and $\kappa_r$ its cumulants. We expand in terms of a known distribution with probability density function ψ, characteristic function $\hat{\psi}$, and cumulants $\gamma_r$. The density ψ is generally chosen to be that of the normal distribution, but other choices are possible as well. By the definition of the cumulants, we have (see Wallace, 1958)

$\hat{f}(t)= \exp\left[\sum_{r=1}^\infty\kappa_r\frac{(it)^r}{r!}\right]$ and
$$\hat{\psi}(t)=\exp\left[\sum_{r=1}^\infty\gamma_r\frac{(it)^r}{r!}\right],$$

which gives the following formal identity:

$$\hat{f}(t)=\exp\left[\sum_{r=1}^\infty(\kappa_r-\gamma_r)\frac{(it)^r}{r!}\right]\hat{\psi}(t)\,.$$

By the properties of the Fourier transform, $(it)^r \hat{\psi}(t)$ is the Fourier transform of $(-1)^r[D^r\psi](-x)$, where D is the differential operator with respect to x. Thus, after changing $x$ with $-x$ on both sides of the equation, we find for f the formal expansion

$$f(x) = \exp\left[\sum_{r=1}^\infty(\kappa_r - \gamma_r)\frac{(-D)^r}{r!}\right]\psi(x)\,.$$

If ψ is chosen as the normal density

$$\varphi(x) = \frac{1}{\sqrt{2\pi}\sigma}\exp\left[-\frac{(x-\mu)^2}{2\sigma^2}\right]$$

with mean and variance as given by f, that is, mean $\mu = \kappa_1$ and variance $\sigma^2 = \kappa_2$, then the expansion becomes

$$f(x) = \exp\left[\sum_{r=3}^\infty\kappa_r\frac{(-D)^r}{r!}\right] \varphi(x),$$

since $\gamma_r=0$ for all r > 2, as higher cumulants of the normal distribution are 0. By expanding the exponential and collecting terms according to the order of the derivatives, we arrive at the Gram–Charlier A series. Such an expansion can be written compactly in terms of Bell polynomials as

$$\exp\left[\sum_{r=3}^\infty\kappa_r\frac{(-D)^r}{r!}\right] = \sum_{n=0}^\infty B_n(0,0,\kappa_3,\ldots,\kappa_n)\frac{(-D)^n}{n!}.$$

Since the n-th derivative of the Gaussian function $\varphi$ is given in terms of Hermite polynomial as

$$\varphi^{(n)}(x) = \frac{(-1)^n}{\sigma^n} \operatorname{He}_n \left( \frac{x-\mu}{\sigma} \right) \varphi(x),$$

this gives us the final expression of the Gram–Charlier A series as

$$f(x) = \varphi(x) \sum_{n=0}^\infty \frac{1}{n! \sigma^n} B_n(0,0,\kappa_3,\ldots,\kappa_n) \operatorname{He}_n \left( \frac{x-\mu}{\sigma} \right).$$

Integrating the series gives us the cumulative distribution function

$$F(x) = \int_{-\infty}^x f(u) du = \Phi(x) - \varphi(x) \sum_{n=3}^\infty \frac{1}{n! \sigma^{n-1}} B_n(0,0,\kappa_3,\ldots,\kappa_n) \operatorname{He}_{n-1} \left( \frac{x-\mu}{\sigma} \right),$$

where $\Phi$ is the CDF of the normal distribution.

If we include only the first two correction terms to the normal distribution, we obtain

$$f(x) \approx \frac{1}{\sqrt{2\pi}\sigma}\exp\left[-\frac{(x-\mu)^2}{2\sigma^2}\right]\left[1+\frac{\kappa_3}{3!\sigma^3}He_3\left(\frac{x-\mu}{\sigma}\right)+\frac{\kappa_4}{4!\sigma^4} \operatorname{He}_4\left(\frac{x-\mu}{\sigma}\right)\right]\,,$$

with $He_3(x)=x^3-3x$ and $\operatorname{He}_4(x)=x^4 - 6x^2 + 3$.

Note that this expression is not guaranteed to be positive, and is therefore not a valid probability distribution. The Gram–Charlier A series diverges in many cases of interest—it converges only if $f(x)$ falls off faster than $\exp(-(x^2)/4)$ at infinity (Cramér 1957). When it does not converge, the series is also not a true asymptotic expansion, because it is not possible to estimate the error of the expansion. For this reason, the Edgeworth series (see next section) is generally preferred over the Gram–Charlier A series.

== The Edgeworth series ==
Edgeworth developed a similar expansion as an improvement to the central limit theorem. The advantage of the Edgeworth series is that the error is controlled, so that it is a true asymptotic expansion.

Let $\{Z_i\}$ be a sequence of independent and identically distributed random variables with finite mean $\mu$ and variance $\sigma^2$, and let $X_n$ be their standardized sums:

$$X_n = \frac{1}{\sqrt{n}} \sum_{i=1}^n \frac{Z_i - \mu}{\sigma}.$$

Let $F_n$ denote the cumulative distribution functions of the variables $X_n$. Then by the central limit theorem,

$$\lim_{n\to\infty} F_n(x) = \Phi(x) \equiv \int_{-\infty}^x \tfrac{1}{\sqrt{2\pi}}e^{-\frac{1}{2}q^2}dq$$

for every $x$, as long as the mean and variance are finite.

The standardization of $\{Z_i\}$ ensures that the first two cumulants of $X_n$ are $\kappa_1^{F_n} = 0$ and $\kappa_2^{F_n} = 1.$ Now assume that, in addition to having mean $\mu$ and variance $\sigma^2$, the i.i.d. random variables $Z_i$ have higher cumulants $\kappa_r$. From the additivity and homogeneity properties of cumulants, the cumulants of $X_n$ in terms of the cumulants of $Z_i$ are for $r \geq 2$,

$$\kappa_r^{F_n} = \frac{n \kappa_r}{\sigma^r n^{r/2}} = \frac{\lambda_r}{n^{r/2 - 1}} \quad \mathrm{where} \quad \lambda_r = \frac{\kappa_r}{\sigma^r}.$$

If we expand the formal expression of the characteristic function $\hat{f}_n(t)$ of $F_n$ in terms of the standard normal distribution, that is, if we set

$$\varphi(x)=\frac{1}{\sqrt{2\pi}}\exp(-\tfrac{1}{2}x^2),$$

then the cumulant differences in the expansion are

$$\kappa^{F_n}_1-\gamma_1 = 0,$$
$$\kappa^{F_n}_2-\gamma_2 = 0,$$
$$\kappa^{F_n}_r-\gamma_r = \frac{\lambda_r}{n^{r/2-1}}; \qquad r\geq 3.$$

The Gram–Charlier A series for the density function of $X_n$ is now

$$f_n(x) = \varphi(x) \sum_{r=0}^\infty \frac{1}{r!} B_r \left(0,0,\frac{\lambda_3}{n^{1/2}},\ldots,\frac{\lambda_r}{n^{r/2-1}}\right) He_r(x).$$

The Edgeworth series is developed similarly to the Gram–Charlier A series, only that now terms are collected according to powers of $n$. The coefficients of n^{−m/2} term can be obtained by collecting the monomials of the Bell polynomials corresponding to the integer partitions of m. Thus, we have the characteristic function as

$$\hat{f}_n(t)=\left[1+\sum_{j=1}^\infty \frac{P_j(it)}{n^{j/2}}\right] \exp(-t^2/2)\,,$$

where $P_j(x)$ is a polynomial of degree $3j$. Again, after inverse Fourier transform, the density function $f_n$ follows as

$$f_n(x) = \varphi(x) + \sum_{j=1}^\infty \frac{P_j(-D)}{n^{j/2}} \varphi(x)\,.$$

Likewise, integrating the series, we obtain the distribution function

$$F_n(x) = \Phi(x) + \sum_{j=1}^\infty \frac{1}{n^{j/2}} \frac{P_j(-D)}{D} \varphi(x)\,.$$

We can explicitly write the polynomial $P_m(-D)$ as

$$P_m(-D) = \sum \prod_i  \frac{1}{k_i!} \left(\frac{\lambda_{l_i}}{l_i!}\right)^{k_i} (-D)^s,$$

where the summation is over all the integer partitions of m such that $\sum_i i k_i = m$ and $l_i = i+2$ and $s = \sum_i k_i l_i.$

For example, if m = 3, then there are three ways to partition this number: 1 + 1 + 1 = 2 + 1 = 3. As such we need to examine three cases:

- 1 + 1 + 1 = 1 · k_{1}, so we have k_{1} = 3, l_{1} = 3, and s = 9.
- 1 + 2 = 1 · k_{1} + 2 · k_{2}, so we have k_{1} = 1, k_{2} = 1, l_{1} = 3, l_{2} = 4, and s = 7.
- 3 = 3 · k_{3}, so we have k_{3} = 1, l_{3} = 5, and s = 5.

Thus, the required polynomial is

$$\begin{align}
P_3(-D) &= \frac{1}{3!} \left(\frac{\lambda_3}{3!}\right)^3 (-D)^9 + \frac{1}{1! 1!} \left(\frac{\lambda_3}{3!}\right) \left(\frac{\lambda_4}{4!}\right) (-D)^7 + \frac{1}{1!} \left(\frac{\lambda_5}{5!}\right) (-D)^5 \\
&= \frac{\lambda_3^3}{1296} (-D)^9 + \frac{\lambda_3 \lambda_4}{144} (-D)^7 + \frac{\lambda_5}{120} (-D)^5.
\end{align}$$

The first five terms of the expansion are

$$\begin{align}
f_n(x) &= \varphi(x) \\
&\quad -n^{-\frac{1}{2}}\left(\tfrac{1}{6}\lambda_3\,\varphi^{(3)}(x) \right) \\
&\quad +n^{-1}\left(\tfrac{1}{24}\lambda_4\,\varphi^{(4)}(x) + \tfrac{1}{72}\lambda_3^2\,\varphi^{(6)}(x) \right) \\
&\quad -n^{-\frac{3}{2}}\left(\tfrac{1}{120}\lambda_5\,\varphi^{(5)}(x) + \tfrac{1}{144}\lambda_3\lambda_4\,\varphi^{(7)}(x) + \tfrac{1}{1296}\lambda_3^3\,\varphi^{(9)}(x)\right) \\
&\quad + n^{-2}\left(\tfrac{1}{720}\lambda_6\,\varphi^{(6)}(x) + \left(\tfrac{1}{1152}\lambda_4^2 + \tfrac{1}{720}\lambda_3\lambda_5\right)\varphi^{(8)}(x) + \tfrac{1}{1728}\lambda_3^2\lambda_4\,\varphi^{(10)}(x) + \tfrac{1}{31104}\lambda_3^4\,\varphi^{(12)}(x) \right)\\
&\quad + O \left (n^{-\frac{5}{2}} \right ).
\end{align}$$

Here, φ^{(j)}(x) is the j-th derivative of φ(·) at point x. Remembering that the derivatives of the density of the normal distribution are related to the normal density by $\varphi^{(n)}(x) = (-1)^n \operatorname{He}_n(x)\varphi(x)$, (where $He_n$ is the Hermite polynomial of order n), this explains the alternative representations in terms of the density function. Blinnikov and Moessner (1998) have given a simple algorithm to calculate higher-order terms of the expansion.

Note that in case of a lattice distributions (which have discrete values), the Edgeworth expansion must be adjusted to account for the discontinuous jumps between lattice points.

== Illustration: density of the sample mean of three χ² distributions ==
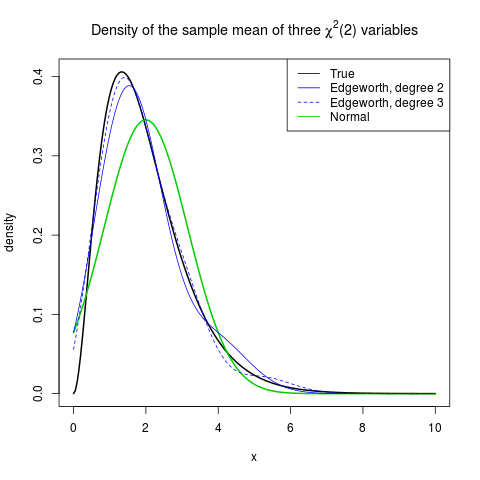
Density of the sample mean of three chi2 variables. The chart compares the true density, the normal approximation, and two Edgeworth expansions.

Take $X_i \sim \chi^2(k=2), \, i=1, 2, 3 \, (n=3)$ and the sample mean $\bar X = \frac{1}{3} \sum_{i=1}^{3} X_i$.

We can use several distributions for $\bar X$:

- The exact distribution, which follows a gamma distribution: $\bar X \sim \mathrm{Gamma}\left(\alpha=n\cdot k /2, \theta= 2/n \right)=\mathrm{Gamma}\left(\alpha=3, \theta= 2/3 \right)$.
- The asymptotic normal distribution: $\bar X \xrightarrow{n \to \infty} N(k, 2\cdot k /n ) = N(2, 4/3 )$.
- Two Edgeworth expansions, of degrees 2 and 3.

== Discussion of results ==
- For finite samples, an Edgeworth expansion is not guaranteed to be a proper probability distribution as the CDF values at some points may go beyond $[0,1]$.
- They guarantee (asymptotically) absolute errors, but relative errors can be easily assessed by comparing the leading Edgeworth term in the remainder with the overall leading term.

== See also ==
- Cornish–Fisher expansion
- Edgeworth binomial tree
