= Hankel singular value =

In control theory, Hankel singular values, named after Hermann Hankel, provide a measure of energy for each state in a system. They are the basis for balanced model reduction, in which high energy states are retained while low energy states are discarded. The reduced model retains the important features of the original model.

Hankel singular values are calculated as the square roots, {σ_{i} ≥ 0, i = 1,…,n}, of the eigenvalues, {λ_{i} ≥ 0, i = 1,…,n}, for the product of the controllability Gramian, W_{C}, and the observability Gramian, W_{O}.

== Properties ==
- The square of the Hilbert-Schmidt norm of the Hankel operator associated with a linear system is the sum of squares of the Hankel singular values of this system. Moreover, the area enclosed by the oriented Nyquist diagram of an BIBO stable and strictly proper linear system is equal π times the square of the Hilbert-Schmidt norm of the Hankel operator associated with this system.
- Hankel singular values also provide the optimal range of analog filters.

== See also ==
- Hankel matrix
- Hermann Hankel
