= Quadrant count ratio =

The quadrant count ratio (QCR) is a measure of the association between two quantitative variables. The QCR is not commonly used in the practice of statistics; rather, it is a useful tool in statistics education because it can be used as an intermediate step in the development of Pearson's correlation coefficient.

== Definition and properties ==
To calculate the QCR, the data are divided into quadrants based on the mean of the $X$ and $Y$ variables. The formula for calculating the QCR is then:

$$q=\frac{[n(\text{Quadrant I})+n(\text{Quadrant III})]-[n(\text{Quadrant II})+n(\text{Quadrant IV})]}{N},$$

where $\text{n(Quadrant)}$ is the number of observations in that quadrant and $N$ is the total number of observations.

The QCR is always between −1 and 1. Values near −1, 0, and 1 indicate strong negative association, no association, and strong positive association (as in Pearson's correlation coefficient). However, unlike Pearson's correlation coefficient the QCR may be −1 or 1 without the data exhibiting a perfect linear relationship.

== Example ==
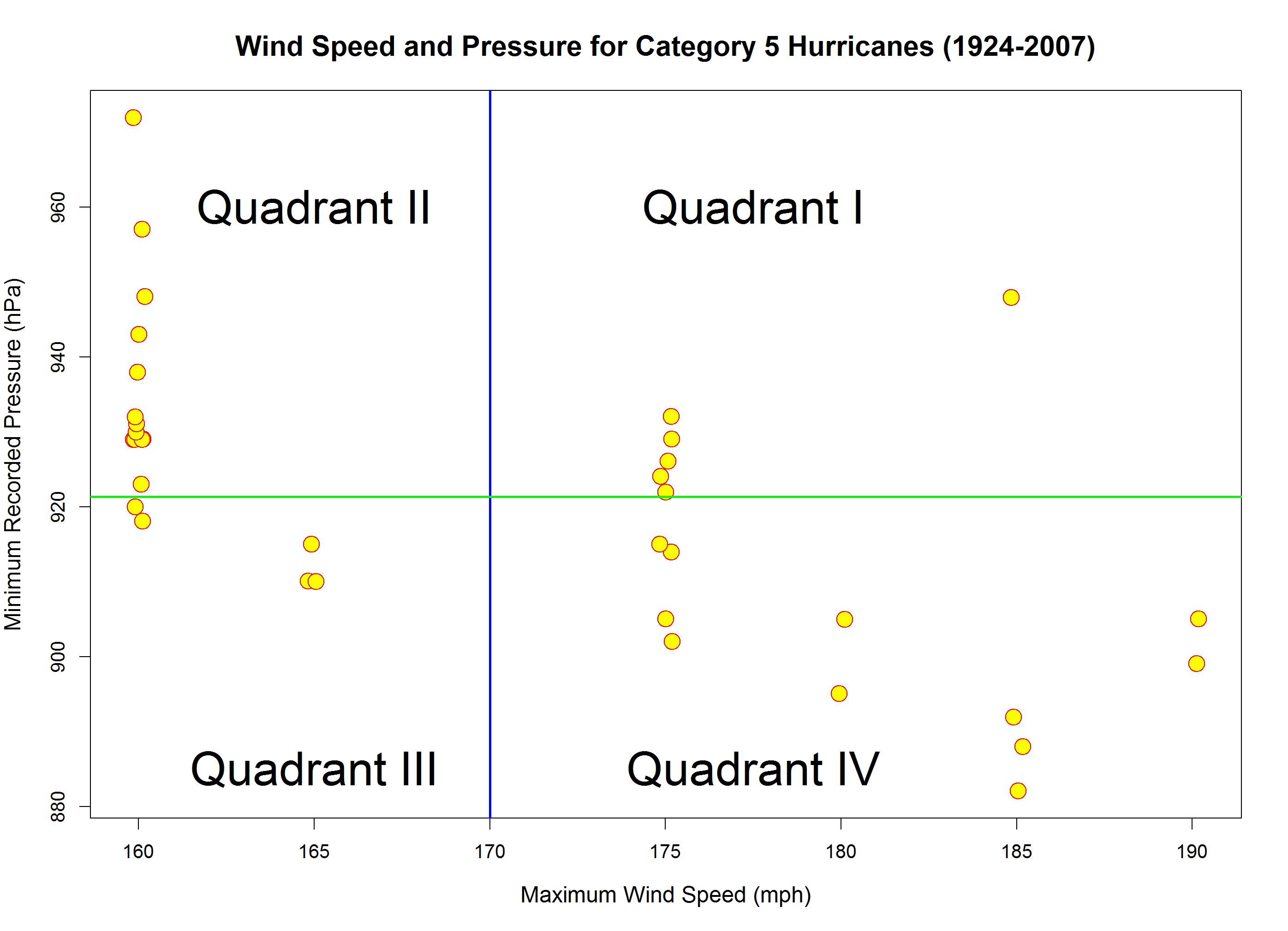
Data from 35 Category 5 Hurricanes showing the relationship between wind speed (X) and pressure (Y). The blue and green lines represent the means of the X and Y values, respectively. The Quadrants have been labeled. The points have been jittered to reduce overlap of observations.

The scatterplot shows the maximum wind speed (X) and minimum pressure (Y) for 35 Category 5 Hurricanes. The mean wind speed is 170 mph (indicated by the blue line), and the mean pressure is 921.31 hPa (indicated by the green line). There are 6 observations in Quadrant I, 13 observations in Quadrant II, 5 observations in Quadrant III, and 11 observations in Quadrant IV. Thus, the QCR for these data is $\frac{(6+5)-(13+11)}{35}=-0.37$, indicating a moderate negative relationship between wind speed and pressure for these hurricanes. The value of Pearson's correlation coefficient for these data is −0.63, also indicating a moderate negative relationship.

== See also ==
- Guidelines for Assessment and Instruction in Statistics Education
- Mean absolute deviation (MAD) – A statistic used as a precursor to standard deviation.
