= Bilgin =

Bilgin is a unisex Turkish given name given name. In Turkish, it means "scholar" or "intellectual".

== Given name ==
- Bilgin Defterli (born 1980), Turkish women's footballer
- Bilgin Özçalkan (born 1976), Turkish rapper known as Ceza

== Surname ==
- Ali Bilgin (born 1981), German-born Turkish footballer
- Ayse Bilgin, Australian statistician
- Belçim Bilgin (born 1983), Turkish actress
- Erol Bilgin (born 1987), Turkish weightlifter
- Yaşar Bilgin (born 1950), Turkish-German politician
- Zehra Bilgin (born 2002), Turkish Olympian swimmer
