= Roxy Peck =

Statistics educator

Roxy L. Peck
- Education: University of California, Riverside
- Scientific career
- Fields: Statistics
- Workplaces: California Polytechnic State University
- Thesis: Some techniques for the analysis of cross-classified ordinal data (1979)

Roxy Lynn Peck is a statistics educator. She is a professor emeritus at California Polytechnic State University (Cal Poly); she was chair of statistics at Cal Poly for six years and associate dean for thirteen more.

Peck grew up moving frequently as the daughter of a journalist, and was the first college-educated member of her family. She did her undergraduate studies in social science at the University of California, Riverside in the 1960s, and was inspired to move into statistics by Florence Nightingale David, the instructor for one of her classes there. After graduating and working for two years as a legal benefits counselor, she returned to UC Riverside where she completed a Ph.D. in applied statistics.

She participated in an effort by the United States Census Bureau in 2000 to push statistics into K–12 education, and was chief reader for AP Statistics from 1999 to 2003. She has also written introductory statistics textbooks and edited a volume of statistical case studies.

In 1998, Peck was elected as a Fellow of the American Statistical Association; she is also a member of the International Statistical Institute. The American Statistical Association gave her their Founder's Award, and the United States Conference On Teaching Statistics gave her their lifetime achievement award.
