= Protein diet =

Protein diet may refer to:

- High-protein diet
- Low-protein diet
