= Jean Innes =

Jean Innes may refer to:

- Jean Saunders (1932-2011), née Innes, British writer of romance novels
- Jean Innes (scientist), British technologist

== See also ==
- Jean Inness, American actress
