= Helen MacGillivray =

Australian statistician and statistics educator

- Education: University of Queensland (Australia)
- Awards: Fellow, Royal Statistical Society
- Scientific career
- Fields: Statistics
- Workplaces: Queensland University of Technology

Helen Louise MacGillivray AM FRSS is an Australian statistician and statistics educator. She is the former president of the International Statistical Institute, the International Association for Statistical Education, and the Statistical Society of Australia, and chair of the United Nations Global Network of Institutions for Statistical Training.

== Education and career ==
MacGillivray entered her studies at the University of Queensland planning to work in physics, but ended up earning a bachelor's degree with honours in mathematics, in the course of which she discovered her love for statistics. She remained at the University of Queensland for graduate study, and completed a Ph.D. in statistics there. Her dissertation was Moment inequalities with applications to particle size distributions.

She was a professor of statistics and director of the Maths Access Centre at Queensland University of Technology (QUT), until her retirement. She continues to hold an adjunct professorship at QUT.

== Service ==
MacGillivray is the editor of the journal Teaching Statistics.

She was president of the International Statistical Institute for the 2017–2019 term. When she was elected president she became both the second woman and the second Australian to hold the position, after Denise Lievesley and Dennis Trewin. She was the first female president of the Statistical Society of Australia. She was president of the International Association for Statistical Education for 2009–2011, and is the founding chair of the Global Network of Institutions for Statistical Training of the United Nations.

== Books ==
With Peter Petocz, MacGillivray is the coauthor of the two-volume textbook Statistics and Probability in the Australian Curriculum (Years 7 and 8, and Years 9 and 10), and is the author of Utts & Heckard's Mind on Statistics (Nelson Australia, 2010, adapted from previous work by Jessica Utts and Robert Heckard).

== Recognition ==
MacGillivray is a Fellow of the Royal Statistical Society, an Australian Learning and Teaching Fellow, an honorary life member of the Statistical Society of Australia, and a Principal Fellow of the Higher Education Academy.

She was appointed a Member of the Order of Australia in the 2024 Australia Day Honours for her "significant service to mathematics and statistics education".
