= Ayse Bilgin =

Australian statistician and statistics educator

Ayşe Ayşin Bombaci Bilgin is an Australian statistician and statistics educator. She is a professor of mathematics and statistics at Macquarie University and the president (2021–2023) of the International Association for Statistical Education. Bilgin's research explores applications of statistics in health sciences and learning and teaching in statistics.

== Education ==
Bilgin earned a master's degree in statistics from the University of Newcastle (Australia) in 1997, and completed her PhD in 2004 in the University of Newcastle School of Medical Practice and Population Health. Bilgin also has a Bachelor's degree in engineering, an MBA, a post graduate diploma in Higher Education (Learning and teaching) and a master's degree in Higher Education (Leadership and management).

== Recognition ==
Bilgin became an Elected Member of the International Statistical Institute in 2015. She was president of the International Association for Statistical Education for the 2021–20231 term and past president 2023–2025. Bilgin is the recipient of several learning and teaching awards for her outstanding contributions to student learning such as an Australian Learning and Teaching Council Citation for 'Outstanding Contributions to Student Learning', a Macquarie University VC Citation, ATEM Award Community Engagement (Highly Commended); Higher Education Award for Employability; joint-recipient of Australian Awards for University Teaching (AAUT). She was awarded "Excellence in research: Five Future-shaping Priorities (Healthy People)" by Macquarie University and she was a member of research team which were the finalist of the Eureka Prize in 2017.
