= Knowledge Quarter =

Knowledge Quarter typically refers to an area of a city that focuses heavily on the education, knowledge and research sectors. It may refer to:

- Knowledge Quarter, Liverpool
- Knowledge Quarter, London
