= Pfannkuch =

Pfannkuch is a German surname, meaning "pancake". Notable people with the name include:

- Karl Pfannkuch (1898–1965), German book editor
- Maxine Pfannkuch, New Zealand statistics educator
- Orville E. Pfannkuch, US Marine Corps Corporal, in List of Navy Cross recipients for World War II
- Thomas Pfannkuch (born 1970), German footballer and football manager
- Wilhelm Pfannkuch (1841–1923), German politician and trade unionist

== See also ==
- Pfannkuchen (disambiguation)
