= George P. McCabe =

American statistician

- Born: April 2, 1945; Brooklyn, New York
- Died: August 17, 2023 (aged 78); West Lafayette, Indiana
- Citizenship: American
- Education: Providence College (BS); Columbia University (PhD)
- Known for: Introduction to the Practice of Statistics (Moore & McCabe)
- Awards: ASA Fellow (1993); AAAS Fellow (2008)
- Scientific career
- Fields: Statistics
- Workplaces: Purdue University
- Thesis: Some Problems in Sequential Discrimination
- Doctoral advisor: Herbert Robbins

George Paul McCabe (April 2, 1945 – August 17, 2023) was an American statistician and professor who served on the faculty of Purdue University for over five decades. He is best known as the co-author (with David S. Moore) of Introduction to the Practice of Statistics, a foundational textbook that expanded the teaching of statistics to encompass data analysis, in contrast with the traditional focus on rote calculation and pure mathematical theory.

== Education and career ==
McCabe graduated from Chaminade High School in 1962, and earned his Bachelor of Science in mathematics from Providence College in 1966. He completed a PhD in Mathematical Statistics from Columbia University in 1970 under the supervision of Herbert Robbins.

He joined the faculty at Purdue University in 1970. In 1980, he founded the Statistical Consulting Service (SCS), serving as its director until 2004. He later served as the Associate Dean for Academic Affairs in the Purdue College of Science from 2004 to 2017.

== Contributions to statistics ==
In total, McCabe authored over 200 publications and provided consulting services to more than 100 clients. His textbooks have been translated into six languages, and he held numerous visiting academic positions and speaking engagements internationally.

=== Pedagogy ===
McCabe's most significant impact on the field was the publication of Introduction to the Practice of Statistics (first edition 1989), co-authored with David S. Moore. The text is notable for shifting the teaching of introductory statistics away from mathematical theory toward a data-analytic focus, emphasizing the use of technology and real-word datasets.

=== Civil rights and legal work ===
McCabe was a pioneer in the application of statistical methods to legal issues, particularly in cases of employment discrimination. He developed methodologies for analyzing salary and hiring data to detect bias, serving as a consultant for numerous universities and government agencies to ensure equitable compensation practices.

=== Nutritional science ===
Collaborating with nutritional scientists, including Connie M. Weaver, McCabe applied statistical modeling to study calcium metabolism and bone health. This research provided critical insights into dietary requirements for adolescent bone development and helped establish nutritional guidelines.

== Legacy and mentorship ==
During his 53-year tenure at Purdue University, McCabe supervised at least a dozen doctoral students, several of whom have attained leadership positions in academia and industry. His mentorship was characterized by an emphasis on statistical consulting and the practical application of quantitative methods to fields such as nutrition, motor behavior, and the life sciences.

McCabe further shaped the department's institutional legacy by founding and directing the Purdue Statistical Consulting Service from 1980 to 2004, which provided graduate students with experience in real-world data analysis, a model that has been widely replicated in other university statistics departments. In February 2024, the Purdue University Senate issued a formal memorial resolution honoring his career and impact on the university community.

== Honors and awards ==
- 1993: Fellow of the American Statistical Association
- 2008: Fellow of the American Association for the Advancement of Science
- 2012: Don Owen Award for Outstanding Contributions to Statistical Research, Applications, and Teaching
- 2022: W. J. Dixon Award for Excellence in Statistical Consulting

== Selected publications ==
- Moore, David S., and George P. McCabe. Introduction to the Practice of Statistics. W.H. Freeman, 1989 (and subsequent editions).
- McCabe, George P. "Principal Variables." Technometrics 26.2 (1984): 137–144.
- For more: see George P. McCabe publications indexed by Google Scholar
