= Kirstine Dale =

British computer scientist

- Dale in 2026
- Born: Kirstine I. O'Connor
- Education: University of Exeter; University of Leeds; University of Glasgow
- Scientific career
- Workplaces: Met Office; University of Exeter
- Thesis: The causes, resolution and consequences of contests for space in Atlantic salmon (Salmo salar L.) (1999)

Kirstine Dale is a British computer scientist who is the Met Office Chief AI Officer. She is responsible for embedding artificial intelligence (AI) across the Met Office, particularly through the "AI for numerical weather prediction" programme. She is also a Fellow at the Alan Turing Institute and an Honorary Professor at the University of Exeter.

== Early life and education ==
Dale's father was a naval fighter navigator. Dale started her scientific career at the University of Leeds, where she studied zoology. She moved to the University of Glasgow for her doctoral research, where she studied the causes and consequences of contests for space in Atlantic salmon. She completed a Master of Business Administration at the University of Exeter.

== Research and career ==
Dale is the Chief AI Officer for the Met Office and honorary Professor at the University of Exeter. The Met Office sees AI as a complement to numerical weather prediction. Traditional forecasts rely on vast physics‑based simulations running on supercomputers; newer AI models act as “surrogate models”, learning the behaviour of those complex systems and reproducing key outputs far more quickly. Dale has worked with the Alan Turing Institute and Met Office to use data science and AI in weather forecasting. A flagship effort is FastNet, a machine‑learning weather prediction model. She has explained that public trust will be critical when using artificial intelligence in weather forecasting.

Dale is an advocate for women in data science and machine learning. Her top advice for entering the sector include: building a support network, following one's interests and demonstrating leadership.

== Selected publications ==
- Dale, Kirstine I.; Pope, Edward C. D.; Hopkinson, Aaron R.; McCaie, Theo; Lowe, Jason A. (October 2023). "Environment-Aware Digital Twins: Incorporating Weather and Climate Information to Support Risk-Based Decision-Making". Artificial Intelligence for the Earth Systems. 2 (4). doi:10.1175/aies-d-23-0023.1. ISSN 2769-7525.
