= National Bone Health Campaign =

US health campaign

The national bone health campaign teaches young girls habits for improving their bone health by encouraging them to eat more foods with calcium and vitamin D, and participating in physical activities that help the bones.

== History ==
The National Bone Health Campaign began in 1999 as a public/private partnership among the Centers for Disease Control and Prevention (CDC), the Department of Health and Human Services' Office on Women’s Health (OWH), and the National Osteoporosis Foundation (NOF).

== See also ==
- Bone density
- Osteoporosis
