= Guidelines for Assessment and Instruction in Statistics Education =

Education framework

Guidelines for Assessment and Instruction in Statistics Education (GAISE) Report: A Pre-K–12 Curriculum Framework
- Author: Christine Franklin, Gary Kader, Denise Mewborn, Jerry Moreno, Roxy Peck, Mike Perry, and Richard Scheaffer
- Language: English
- Subject: Statistics Education
- Publisher: American Statistical Association
- Publication date: 2007
- Pages: 108
- ISBN: 978-0-9791747-1-1
- LC Class: QA276.18.G85 2007

The Guidelines for Assessment and Instruction in Statistics Education (GAISE) are a framework for statistics education in grades Pre-K–12 published by the American Statistical Association (ASA) in 2007. The foundations for this framework are the Principles and Standards for School Mathematics published by the National Council of Teachers of Mathematics (NCTM) in 2000. A second report focused on statistics education at the collegiate level, the GAISE College Report, was published in 2005. Both reports were endorsed by the ASA. Several grants awarded by the National Science Foundation explicitly reference the GAISE documents as influencing or guiding the projects, and several popular introductory statistics textbooks have cited the GAISE documents as informing their approach.

== The GAISE Report (pre-K–12) ==
The GAISE document provides a two-dimensional framework, specifying four components used in statistical problem solving (formulating questions, collecting data, analyzing data, and interpreting results) and three levels of conceptual understanding through which a student should progress (Levels A, B, and C). A direct parallel between these conceptual levels and grade levels is not made because most students would begin at Level A when they are first exposed to statistics regardless of whether they are in primary, middle, or secondary school. A student's level of statistical maturity is based on experience rather than age.

== The GAISE College Report ==
The GAISE College Report begins by synthesizing the history and current understanding of introductory statistics courses and then lists goals for students based on statistical literacy. Six recommendations for introductory statistics courses are given, namely:

1. Emphasize statistical thinking and literacy over other outcomes
2. Use real data where possible
3. Emphasize conceptual rather than procedural understanding
4. Take an active learning approach
5. Analyze data using technology rather than by hand
6. Focus on supporting student learning with assessments

Examples and suggestions for how these recommendations could be implemented are included in several appendices.
