= International Association for Statistical Education =

Section of the International Statistical Institute

The International Association for Statistical Education (IASE) is a section of the International Statistical Institute (ISI), a professional association of statisticians, devoted to statistics education. It was founded in 1991 as an outgrowth of the ISI Statistical Education Committee, which had operated since 1948.

Since 2002 the ISI and IASE have published the Statistics Education Research Journal. The IASE is also associated with the quadrennial International Conference on Teaching Statistics, with satellite conferences of the World Statistics Congress, and with smaller roundtable workshops.

The presidents of the IASE have included David Vere-Jones (1991–1993), David S. Moore (1993–1995), Anne Hawkins (1995–1997), Maria Gabriella Ottaviani (1997–1999), Brian Phillips (1999–2001), Carmen Batanero (2001–2003), Chris Wild (2003–2005), Gilberte Schuyten (2005–2007), Allan Rossman (2007–2009), Helen MacGillivray (2009–2011), John Harraway (2011–2013), Iddo Gal (2013–2015), Andrej Blejec (2015–2017), Gail F. Burrill (2017–2019), and Joachim Engel (2019–2021).
