= Alan Turing Institute =

Research institute in Britain

Coordinates: 51°31′46″N 0°07′37″W

The Alan Turing Institute
- Founded: 2015; 11 years ago
- Founder: UK Government
- Type: Research institute
- Registration no.: England and Wales: 09512457
- Purpose: Data science, National Security
- Location: British Library
- Members: University of Birmingham; University of Bristol; University of Cambridge; University of Edinburgh; University of Exeter; University of Southampton; University of Oxford; University College London; University of Warwick; Queen Mary University of London; University of Manchester; University of Leeds; University of Newcastle; Engineering and Physical Sciences Research Council
- CEO: Mark Girolami (interim) / George Williamson (exp. May 2026)
- Website: www.turing.ac.uk

The Alan Turing Institute is the United Kingdom's national institute for data science and artificial intelligence, founded in 2015 and largely funded by the UK Government. It is named after Alan Turing, the British mathematician and computing pioneer. Since 2025, the institute focuses on defense and national security, following demands by the UK Government.

== Background ==
The Alan Turing Institute was founded following a letter from the Council for Science and Technology (CST) to the UK prime minister (7 June 2013), describing the "Age of Algorithms". The letter presented a case that "The Government, working with the universities and industry, should create a National Centre to promote advanced research and translational work in algorithms and the application of data science".

The Alan Turing Institute fits into a complex organisational landscape that includes the Open Data Institute, the Digital Catapult and infrastructure investments. The role of the institute is to provide the expertise and fundamental research into data science and artificial intelligence needed to solve real-world problems.

The Alan Turing Institute has since 2021 run an annual event called AI UK, which is described as a national showcase of data science and artificial intelligence.

The organisation's intranet is called Mathison, which was Alan Turing's middle name.

== History ==
In 2015, Lloyd's Register Foundation became the institute's first strategic partner, providing a grant of £10 million over five years to support research into the engineering applications of big data.

In March 2023, the Turing Institute announced a new strategy, dubbed "Turing 2.0" where AI was to focus on health, the environment and national security. Following the release of the strategy, an all-male team of four senior academics was hired to deliver on the new strategy, leading to a letter signed by 180 staff members to express serious concerns about the institute's approach to diversity and inclusion.

In October 2024, the Institute started a redundancy consultation process, affecting around 140 of the 440 staff members.

In December 2024, 93 employees of the Alan Turing Institute sent a letter to the board of the institute to expresses no confidence in the body's executive leadership and asked the board to intervene. In addition to concerns about gender diversity and the redundancy round, the letter mentions the institute's sense of direction as issues. Furthermore, it outlines how a lack of accountability and transparency, as well as poor decision making by the executive, are leading to a catastrophic decline in trust in leadership and rising levels of stress and burnout across employees. Reportedly, an internal review by the institute mirrors these conclusions.

On 4 July 2025, it was reported that the technology secretary Peter Kyle demanded a further overhaul of the Alan Turing Institute, calling for a focus on defence and national security, and a change of leadership. In a letter to the chair of the Turing, Kyle reportedly wrote that "it remains clear that further action is needed to ensure the ATI meets its full potential". Around that time, ATI was undergoing a restructuring with about 50 staff notified that they were at risk of redundancy. A letter in August 2025 from Kyle called for leadership change, as well as repeating his call for the change of focus. He warned long-term funding could be reviewed in 2026. The Guardian and BBC reported that staff of the ATI "have raised concerns about the organisation's governance and internal culture" in a whistleblowing complaint to the Charity Commission, after staff also complained to the institute's main funder, UK Research and Innovation (UKRI). The BBC reported on the internal response to staff by Turing's Chair Doug Gurr and CEO Jean Innes, claiming a commitment to "honesty, integrity and transparency" that was viewed by the whistleblowers as "performative". On 4 September 2025, the institute announced that Innes will be stepping down as the CEO. In an interview with the BBC, published on 28 October 2025, Gurr claimed that the whistleblower complaints had been "independently investigated", but did not name which third party had conducted that investigation. In March 2026, the Charity Commission issued formal regulatory advice and guidance to the trustees of the institute and closed the case without a statutory inquiry.

In February 2026, it was announced that George Williamson, head of His Majesty's Government Communications Centre at the time, would start as the new chief executive of the Turing from May 2026, further deepening the institute's shift towards defence and national security. On 1 April 2026, the institute announced that chair Doug Gurr had resigned to become chair of the Competition and Markets Authority and that former co-deputy chair Vanessa Lawrence would fill the role of chair in the interim. In April 2026, it was reported that the UKRI had conducted a review which found that ATI was underperforming in strategy and value for money, with the reviewer saying ATI needed to be "focused, effective and aligned to national need".

== Organisation ==
The Alan Turing Institute is an independent private-sector legal entity, operating not-for-profit and as a charity. It is a joint venture among the University of Cambridge, the University of Edinburgh, the University of Oxford, University College London (UCL) and the University of Warwick, selected on the basis of international peer review. In 2018, the institute was joined by eight additional university partners: Queen Mary University of London, University of Leeds, University of Manchester, University of Newcastle, University of Southampton, University of Birmingham, University of Exeter and University of Bristol.

The Engineering and Physical Sciences Research Council (EPSRC), the primary funder of the institute, is also a member of the joint venture. The primary responsibility for establishing the Alan Turing Institute has been assigned to the EPSRC, with continuing engagement in the shaping of the institute from the Department for Business, Energy and Industrial Strategy (BEIS) and the Government Office for Science.

In 2024 there were 440 staff members, and as of 2025, "over 400 researchers collaborate[d] at the Turing", without information how many were actually employed.

=== Leadership ===
- Howard Covington, chair 2015–2022
- The inaugural Director from 2015 was Andrew Blake (scientist).
- Alan Wilson became CEO and Andrew Blake was research director.
- Between 2018 and 2023, the Director and CEO was Sir Adrian Smith.
- Doug Gurr, was appointed as chair in 2022, stepped down in April 2026
- Jean Innes has been CEO between 2023 and 2025.
- Mark Girolami (interim)
- George Williamson (expected to start in May 2026)

=== Strategic Partners Board ===
As of 2025, Turing strategic partners included Accenture (since 2017), the DSO National Laboratories, the Gates Foundation with research on "Trustworthy Digital Infrastructure" for national digital identity systems, GCHQ Ministry of Defence with research on implications and risks of climate change to human and national security, Lloyd's Register Foundation on data-centric engineerin, NATS (UK's air traffic control provider), Office for National Statistics and Roche on "disease, patient, and outcome heterogeneity". The partnership with NATS and the University of Exeter, Project Bluebird, began in 2021 as an EPSRC Prosperity Partnership applying machine learning to air traffic control, and won the Grand Prix at The Engineer's Collaborate to Innovate awards for 2025.

== Funding ==
Funding for the creation of the institute came from a £600m investment for the "Eight Great Technologies", and specifically so-called "big data", signalled by the UK Government in 2013 and announced by George Osborne, Chancellor of the Exchequer, in the 2014 budget. The bulk of the investment in "big data" was directed to computational infrastructure. Of the remainder, £42m was allocated to the institute to cover the first five years of its operation. The five founder universities each contributed £5m to the institute. Further funding has come primarily through grants from Research Councils, university partners and from strategic and other partnerships.

In June 2021, the EPSRC awarded the institute £10 million, on behalf of UK Research and Innovation, for 2021/22.

The government's 2024 Spring Budget provided a further £100m, spread over five years, directed towards applying data science and artificial intelligence to healthcare, protecting the environment and bolstering national defence. Soon after, a review by the Engineering and Physical Sciences Research Council recommended improvements in financial oversight of funding for the institute.

== Location ==
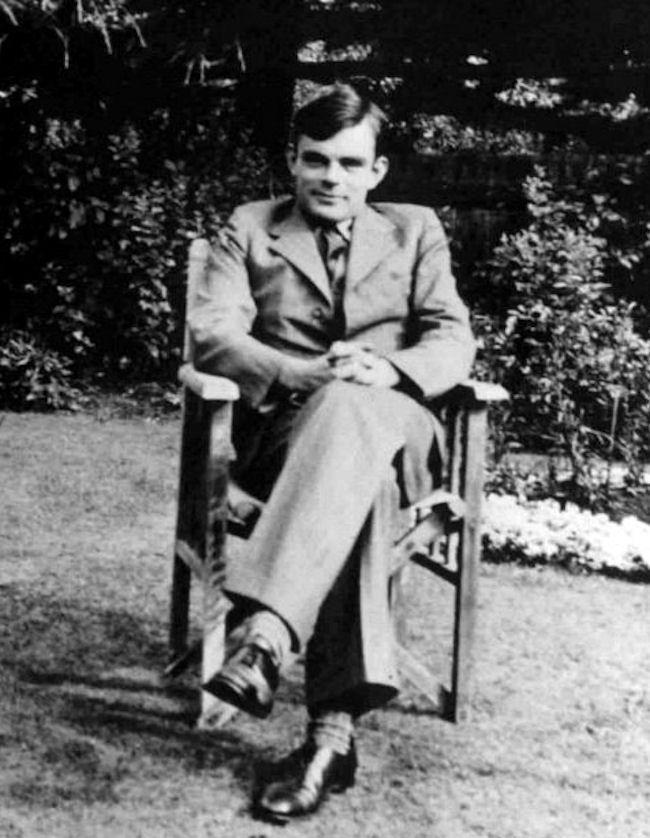
The institute is named in honour of Alan Turing, often considered the father of computer science.

Concurrently with the selection of founder universities, the EPSRC initiated a process to find a "location partner". The resulting selection of the British Library in London was announced by the Chancellor of the Exchequer in December 2014 during the launch of the Knowledge Quarter, a partnership of organisations in and around the King's Cross area of the capital.

In February 2023, plans for a new building were approved by the local council. As of 2023, the Alan Turing Institute was housed within the current British Library building, but it was anticipated it would occupy new premises in a development planned on land between the Francis Crick Institute and library.

== See also ==
- AI Security Institute
