= Pfannkuchen =

Pfannkuchen may refer to:

- Berliner Pfannkuchen, sometimes called Krapfen, a filled pastry
- Eierkuchen, which is a German pancake

== See also ==
- Pfannkuch, list of people with the surname
