= Joan Garfield =

American educational psychologist

Joan B. Garfield is an American educational psychologist specializing in statistics education. She is retired from the University of Minnesota as a professor emeritus of educational psychology.

== Education ==
Garfield entered the University of Wisconsin intending to study anthropology, but graduated in 1972 with a bachelor's degree in education and a minor in mathematics. She became a middle school mathematics teacher but, realizing she needed more preparation as a teacher, returned to graduate school. She chose the University of Minnesota hoping to work with Donovan Johnson, whose works she had read, but he had retired and she instead worked with his student Robert Jackson. She earned a master's degree in mathematics education from the University of Minnesota in 1978, and while working on it was encouraged by statistician Raymond O. Collier Jr. to continue for doctoral studies. She completed her Ph.D. in educational psychology from the University of Minnesota in 1981.

== Career ==
Garfield began teaching at University of Minnesota faculty in 1979 as a summer mathematics instructor, as a way of supplementing her income as a graduate student, and remained at the university for the rest of her career, becoming a full professor in 2002.

She chaired the American Statistical Association Section on Statistics Education in 2003, and in the same year was president of the American Educational Research Association Special Interest Group for Educational Statisticians.

== Books ==
Garfield is the editor of several books in statistics education and the author, with Dani Ben Zvi, of Developing Students’ Statistical Reasoning: Connecting Research and Teaching Practice (Springer, 2008).

== Recognition ==
In 2001 Garfield was recognized as a Fellow of the American Statistical Association. She has been an Elected Member of the International Statistical Institute since 2002. In 2005 the American Statistical Association gave her their Founder's Award for distinguished service to the association. The Consortium for the Advancement of Undergraduate Statistics Education gave her their lifetime achievement award in 2007.
