= Beth Chance =

American statistics educator

Beth L. Chance (born 1968) is an American statistics educator. She is a professor of statistics at the California Polytechnic State University.

== Education and career ==
Chance is originally from San Diego, California. She graduated from Harvey Mudd College in 1990, majoring in mathematics with a minor in psychology. She completed a Ph.D. in operations research, concentrating in statistics, at Cornell University in 1994. Her dissertation, Behavior Characterization and Estimation for General Hierarchical Multivariate Linear Regression Models, was supervised by Martin Wells.

She was a faculty member at the University of the Pacific from 1994 until 1999, when she moved to the California Polytechnic State University. She was chair of the American Statistical Association Section on Statistics and Data Science Education for 2018.

== Books ==
Chance is the author or coauthor of multiple statistics textbooks including:

- Workshop Statistics: Discovery with Data (with A. Rossman and R. Lock, 1998; 4th ed., 2011)
- Statistics: Preparing for the AP Exam (with J. Bohan, 2005)
- Statistical Questions from the Classroom (with J. M. Shaughnessy, 2005)
- Focus in High School Mathematics: Reasoning and Sense Making in Statistics and Probability (with J. M. Shaughnessy and H. Kranendonk, 2009)
- Introduction to Statistical Inference (with N. Tintle, G. Cobb, A. Rossman, S. Roy, T. Swanson, and J. VanderStoep, 2016)
- Intermediate Statistical Investigations (N. Tintle, K. McGaughey, S. Roy, T. Swanson, and J. VanderStoep, 2019)

== Recognition ==
In 2002, Chance became the inaugural recipient of the Waller Education Award of the American Statistical Association Section on Statistics and Data Science Education. In 2003, she won the Mu Sigma Rho Statistics Education Award.

She became a Fellow of the American Statistical Association in 2005. She is also an Elected Member of the International Statistical Institute.
