= Bani K. Mallick =

Indian statistician

- Education: University of Connecticut; Calcutta University
- Known for: Bayesian inference
- Scientific career
- Fields: Bayesian statistics
- Workplaces: Texas A&M University
- Thesis: Bayesian Modeling Incorporating Unknown Monotone Functions
- Doctoral advisor: Alan E. Gelfand
- Doctoral students: Chris Holmes; Veera Baladandayuthapani

Bani K. Mallick is an Indian statistician who is a Distinguished Professor and Susan M. Arseven `75 Chair in Data Science and Computational Statistics in the Department of Statistics at Texas A&M University in College Station. He is the director of the Center for Statistical Bioinformatics. Mallick is well known for his contribution to the theory and practice of Bayesian semiparametric methods and uncertainty quantification.

Mallick is an elected fellow of American Association for the Advancement of Science, American Statistical Association, Institute of Mathematical Statistics, International Statistical Institute and the Royal Statistical Society. He received the Distinguished research award from Texas A&M University and the Young Researcher award from the International Indian Statistical Association.

Mallick's areas of research include semiparametric classification and regression, hierarchical spatial modeling, inverse problem, uncertainty quantification and Bioinformatics. He has coauthored or co-edited six books and more than 200 research publications.

Mallick earned his undergraduate from the Presidency University, Kolkata, MS from the Calcutta University and Ph.D. from the University of Connecticut.

== Bibliography ==
- Dey, D., Ghosh, S. and Mallick, B. (1999) Bayesian Generalized Linear Model, Marcel Dekker
- Denison, D., Holmes, C., Mallick, B. and Smith, AFM (2002) Bayesian nonlinear Classification and Regression, Wiley, London
- Denison, D., Hanson, M., Holmes, C., Mallick, B. and Yu, B. (2003) Nonlinear Classification and Regression, Springer Verlag, New York
- Mallick, B., Gold, D., and Baladandanayak, V. (2010) Bayesian analysis of gene expression data, Wiley International.
- Biegler, L., Ghattas, O., Keyes, D., Mallick, B., Tenorio, L. and Wilcox, K. (2011) Large scale inverse problems and quantification of Uncertainty, Wiley, International
- Dey, D., Ghosh, S. and Mallick, B. (2011) Bayesian Modeling issues in Bioinformatics and Biostatistics, chapman and hall.
