= Veera Baladandayuthapani =

Indian-American statistician

- Education: Indian Institute of Technology Kharagpur (BSc); University of Rochester (MS); Texas A&M University (PhD)
- Awards: Fellow of the American Statistical Association; Fellow of AAAS; Myrto Lefkopoulou Lectureship (Harvard); H. O. Hartley Award (Texas A&M University); Young Researcher Award (IISA)
- Scientific career
- Fields: Biostatistics; Cancer Data Science; Bayesian Statistics
- Workplaces: University of Michigan School of Public Health; University of Texas MD Anderson Cancer Center
- Doctoral advisor: Bani K Mallick

Veera Baladandayuthapani is an Indian and American statistician, currently serving as Jeremy M.G. Taylor Collegiate Professor and Chair of the Department of Biostatistics at the University of Michigan School of Public Health. He is widely recognized for his pioneering research in biostatistics, cancer data science, and the development of Bayesian methods for high-dimensional biomedical data analysis.

== Early life and education ==
Baladandayuthapani was born in India. He studied at the Indian Institute of Technology (IIT), Kharagpur, earning a BSc in Mathematics and Computing. He received a MA in Statistics from the University of Rochester in 2000 and a PhD in Statistics from Texas A&M University in 2005.

== Career ==
After his PhD, Baladandayuthapani joined the University of Texas MD Anderson Cancer Center as a Professor and Institute Faculty Scholar, working there for 13 years. He held adjunct appointments at Rice University, Texas A&M University, and UT School of Public Health, contributing to oncology and genomics modeling.

In 2018, he joined the University of Michigan School of Public Health, and has served as Professor, Associate Director of Quantitative Data Sciences, and Director of the Cancer Data Science Shared Resource at the Rogel Cancer Center. As of July 1, 2024, he was named Chair of the Department of Biostatistics.

== Research ==
Baladandayuthapani is a leader in the application of Bayesian probabilistic models and machine learning to high-dimensional biological data such as genomics, epigenomics, transcriptomics, and proteomics. His work also extends to neuro- and cancer-imaging.

He has co-authored over 150 papers in top statistical, machine learning, bioinformatics, biomedical, and oncology journals, and a book on Bayesian analysis of gene expression data. His group has developed multiple software tools for integrative genomics and spatial biology.

== Honors and recognition ==
- Fellow, American Statistical Association (ASA)
- Elected Member, International Statistical Institute (ISI)
- Myrto Lefkopoulou Distinguished Lectureship, Harvard School of Public Health (2019)
- H. O. Hartley Award, Texas A&M University (2018)
- Young Researcher Award, International Indian Statistical Association (2015)
- Faculty Scholar Award, UT MD Anderson Cancer Center (2014)
- Fellow, American Association for the Advancement of Science (AAAS)

== Professional memberships ==
- American Statistical Association
- International Statistical Institute
- American Association for the Advancement of Science

== Selected publications ==
- Baladandayuthapani, V. Bayesian Hierarchical Varying-Sparsity Model with Application to Cancer Proteogenomics. Journal of American Statistical Association. 2018.
- Ni, Y, Stingo S., Baladandayuthapani, V. Bayesian Graphical Regression. Journal of American Statistical Association. 2018.
- Bharath, K, Kurtek, S, Rao, AU.K., Baladandayuthapani, V. Radiologic Image-based Statistical Shape Analysis of Brain Tumors. Journal of Royal Statistical Society - Series C. 2018.

== Personal life ==
Baladandayuthapani lives in Ann Arbor, Michigan, with his wife Upali Nanda, Professor of Practice of Architecture at the University of Michigan and EVP, Global Sector Director of Innovation at HKS, Inc. He has two sons, Aarith and Aayush.

== See also ==
- Biostatistics
- Bayesian statistics
- Cancer informatics
