= Alan Wilson (academic) =

British mathematician (born 1939)

Sir Alan Wilson FRS FBA FAcSS
- Born: Alan Geoffrey Wilson; 8 January 1939 (age 87); Bradford, England, UK
- Education: Queen Elizabeth Sixth Form College
- Alma mater: University of Cambridge (MA)
- Awards: Knight Bachelor (2001)
- Scientific career
- Institutions: Alan Turing Institute; University College London; University of Leeds; Rutherford Appleton Laboratory; London Interdisciplinary School
- Website: iris.ucl.ac.uk/iris/browse/profile?upi=AGWIL25

Sir Alan Geoffrey Wilson FRS FBA FAcSS (born 8 January 1939) is a British mathematician and social scientist, former Vice-Chancellor of the University of Leeds and a professor at University College London.

== Early life and education ==
Wilson was born in Bradford on 8 January 1939, and educated at Queen Elizabeth Grammar School, Darlington and the University of Cambridge where he was an undergraduate student of Corpus Christi College, Cambridge and studied the Mathematical Tripos, graduating in 1960.

== Career and research ==
Wilson converted in the 1960s from theoretical physics to the social sciences through research on the mathematical modelling of cities (working in Oxford and London). From 1961 to 1964, he was a Scientific Officer in the Theoretical Physics Group at the Rutherford Laboratory; from 1964 to 1966, a Research Officer at the Institute of Economics and Statistics in the University of Oxford; from 1966 to 1968, Head of the Mathematical Advisory Group at the Ministry of Transport; and from 1968 to 1970, assistant director of the Centre for Environmental Studies in London. He was appointed Professor of Urban and Regional Geography at the University of Leeds in 1970, Pro-Vice-Chancellor in 1989 and was Vice Chancellor from 1991. He was elected a Fellow of the British Academy in 1994, and was knighted in 2001.

Sir Alan retired in May 2004 after 13 years as Vice-Chancellor. During his time the university underwent unprecedented growth and transformation. Student numbers increased from 12,000 to 31,500, turnover increased from £100m to £320m and research income increased by more than 400% to £71m.

His knowledge of the university sector led to his appointment as first Director General for Higher Education by the UK Government at the Department for Education and Skills, a post which he took up part-time in February 2004 and full-time on 1 June 2004 until 2007. In this role, he was a key adviser to secretaries of state Charles Clarke, Ruth Kelly and Alan Johnson, and played a critical role in the government's drive to widen participation in higher education and maintaining a world-class education system.

In May 2006 he was appointed Master of Corpus Christi College, Cambridge, and took up the post in October. He resigned from the post of Master of Corpus Christi on 1 May 2007, after only seven months in post.

In September, 2007, he joined University College London to serve as Professor of Urban and Regional Systems at the Centre for Advanced Spatial Analysis He was the Chairman of the Arts and Humanities Research Council (AHRC) from 2007 to 2013. Since 2013, he has been Chair of the Home Office Science Advisory Council and Chair of the Lead Expert Group of the Government Office for Science Foresight project on the Future of Cities.

In 2016, he was appointed as Interim CEO of the Alan Turing Institute before becoming director of special projects when Adrian Smith took over. He retired as executive chair of the Ada Lovelace Institute in February 2020, having overseen the organisation's development phase, and was succeeded by Dame Wendy Hall.

In 2022, he took on a new role at the London Interdisciplinary School (LIS) as the Director of Research and a Board Observer. In this role, as of 2024, he is responsible for applying his extensive experience and expertise in Interdisciplinary studies to support the institution's interdisciplinary educational and research initiatives.

=== Publications ===
- Entropy in urban and regional modelling. London: Pion, 1970. 166 p. / Russ. ed.: Вильсон А. Дж. Энтропийные методы моделирования сложных систем. – М., Наука, 1978. 248 с.

=== Awards and honours ===
Wilson was elected a Fellow of the Royal Society (FRS) in 2006. He was awarded the Laureat d'Honneur by the International Geographical Union and the 2004 Prize in Regional Science by the European Regional Science Association.

== Personal life ==
Wilson's wife's name is Sarah.Wilson was mentioned on 16 January at IRM.

Academic offices
Preceded by Edward Parkes	Vice-Chancellor, University of Leeds; 1991–2004	Succeeded by Michael Arthur
Preceded by Haroon Ahmed	Master of Corpus Christi College, Cambridge; 2006-2007	Succeeded by Oliver Rackham
