= David S. Moore =

American statistician

- Citizenship: American
- Education: Princeton University, Cornell University
- Known for: writing statistics textbooks
- Scientific career
- Fields: Statistics

David Sheldon Moore is an American statistician, who is known for his leadership of statistics education for many decades.

== Biography ==
David S. Moore received his A.B. from Princeton University and the Ph.D. from Cornell University in mathematics.

In statistics education, David S. Moore is the author of a series of influential textbooks in statistical science, which use only high school algebra: Introduction to the Practice of Statistics (with George P. McCabe), of An Introduction to the Basic Practice of Statistics, and of Statistics: Concepts and Controversies.

In statistical science, David S. Moore has done research in the asymptotic theory of robust and nonparametric statistics.

In 1995, Moore received the Deborah and Franklin Haimo Award for Distinguished College or University Teaching of Mathematics.

Professor Moore was the 1998 President of the American Statistical Association.

David S. Moore is a retired (in 2004) Shanti S. Gupta distinguished professor of statistics, emeritus at Purdue University.

Professor Moore has served as the second president of the International Association for Statistical Education. He was the content developer for the Annenberg/Corporation for Public Broadcasting college-level telecourse Against All Odds: Inside Statistics.

== Publications ==
- Introduction to the Practice of Statistics with George McCabe. ISBN 0716764008
- The Basic Practice of Statistics. ISBN 071677478X
- Statistics: Concepts and Controversies. ISBN 1429237023
- Moore, David S (Jan 1988). "Should Mathematicians Teach Statistics?". The College Mathematics Journal. 19 (1): 3–7. doi:10.2307/2686686. JSTOR 2686686.
- Cobb, George W.; Moore, David S (Nov 1997). "Mathematics, Statistics, and Teaching". The American Mathematical Monthly. 104 (9): 801–823. doi:10.2307/2975286. JSTOR 2975286.
- Moore, David S.; Cobb, George W. (August–September 2000). "Statistics and Mathematics: Tension and Cooperation". The American Mathematical Monthly. 107 (7): 615–630. doi:10.2307/2589117. JSTOR 2589117. MR 1543690.
