= Adrian Smith (statistician) =

British statistician (born 1946)

Sir Adrian Smith FRS FRSS
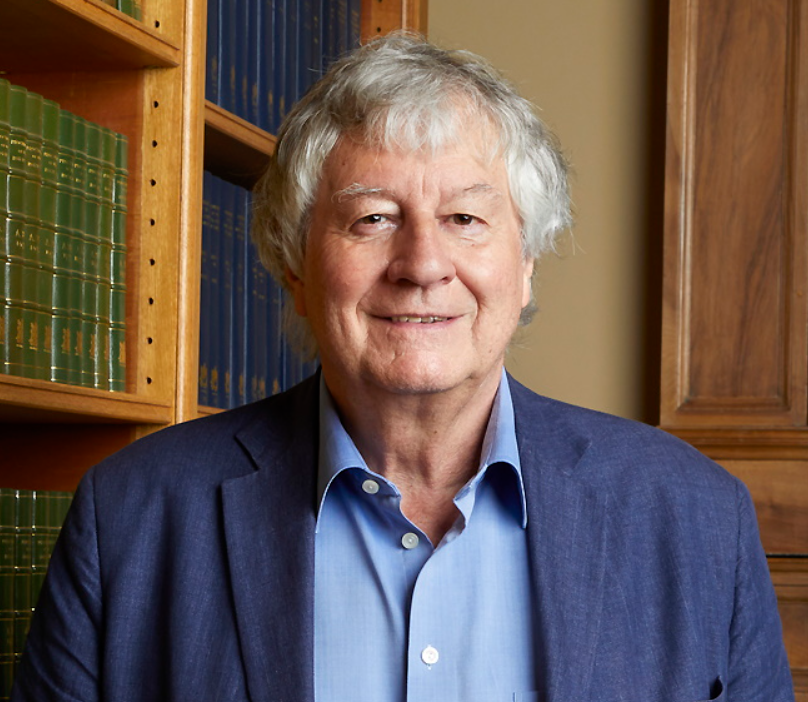

63rd President of the Royal Society
- In office 30 November 2020 – 1 December 2025
- Preceded by: Venki Ramakrishnan
- Succeeded by: Paul Nurse

Personal details
- Born: Adrian Frederick Melhuish Smith; 9 September 1946 (age 80) Dawlish, Devon, England
- Scientific career
- Education: University of Cambridge; University College London
- Awards: Guy Medal (Bronze, 1977) (Silver, 1993) (Gold, 2016)
- Fields: Statistics
- Workplaces: Imperial College London; Queen Mary, University of London
- Thesis: Bayesian inference for the linear model (1972)
- Doctoral advisor: Dennis Lindley
- Doctoral students: Chris Holmes; David Spiegelhalter; Mike West

Sir Adrian Frederick Melhuish Smith (born 9 September 1946) is a British statistician who was chief executive of the Alan Turing Institute from 2018 to 2023 and president of the Royal Society from 2020 to 2025.

== Early life and education ==
Smith was born on 9 September 1946 in Dawlish in Devon. He was educated at Selwyn College, Cambridge, and University College London, where his PhD supervisor was Dennis Lindley.

== Career ==
From 1977 until 1990, he was professor of statistics and head of department of mathematics at the University of Nottingham. He was subsequently at Imperial College, London, where he was head of the mathematics department. Smith is a former deputy vice-chancellor of the University of London and became vice-chancellor of the university on 1 September 2012. He stood down from the role in August 2018 to become the director of the Alan Turing Institute.

Smith is a member of the governing body of the London Business School. He served on the Advisory Council for the Office for National Statistics from 1996 to 1998, was statistical advisor to the Nuclear Waste Inspectorate from 1991 to 1998 and was advisor on Operational Analysis to the Ministry of Defence from 1982 to 1987.

He is a former president of the Royal Statistical Society. He was elected a Fellow of the Royal Society in 2001. His FRS citation included "his diverse contributions to Bayesian statistics. His monographs are the most comprehensive available and his work has had a major impact on the development of monitoring tools for clinicians."

In statistical theory, Smith is a proponent of Bayesian statistics and evidence-based practice—a general extension of evidence-based medicine into all areas of public policy. With Antonio Machi, he translated Bruno de Finetti's Theory of Probability into English. He wrote an influential paper in 1990 along with Alan E. Gelfand, which drew attention to the significance of the Gibbs sampler technique for Bayesian numerical integration problems. He was also co-author of the seminal paper on the particle filter (Gordon, Salmond and Smith, 1993).

In mathematics and statistics education, Smith led the team which produced the Smith Report on secondary mathematics education in the United Kingdom.

In April 2008, Smith was appointed as director general of science and research at the Department for Innovation, Universities and Skills (since merged with other departments to form the UK's BEIS). He took up his post in September 2008. His annual remuneration for this role was £160,000.

Smith was knighted in the 2011 New Year Honours. In 2023, he was a guest on The Life Scientific on BBC Radio 4.

== Honorary doctorates ==
In 2011, Smith was awarded an honorary doctorate of science from the University of Plymouth in 2015, an honorary doctorate of science from Ohio State University, and in 2020, an honorary doctorate from Federal University of Rio de Janeiro. He also was awarded honorary doctorates from City University, the University of Loughborough, Queen Mary and the University of London.

== Bibliography ==
- Gelfand, A. E.; Smith, A. F. M. (1990). "Sampling-Based Approaches to Calculating Marginal Densities". Journal of the American Statistical Association. 85 (410): 398–409. doi:10.2307/2289776. JSTOR 2289776.
- Gordon, N.J.; Salmond, D.J.; Smith, A.F.M. (1993). "Novel approach to nonlinear/non-Gaussian Bayesian state estimation". IEE Proceedings F - Radar and Signal Processing. 140 (2). Institution of Engineering and Technology (IET): 107. doi:10.1049/ip-f-2.1993.0015. ISSN 0956-375X.
- Smith, Adrian (2004). Making Mathematics Count: The Report of Professor Adrian Smith's Inquiry into Post-14 Mathematics Education. London, England: The Stationery Office.

== See also ==
- List of Vice-Chancellors of the University of London
- List of presidents of the Royal Society

Business positions
Preceded by Alan Wilson	Director and CEO of Alan Turing Institute; 2018–2023	Succeeded by Jean Innes
Academic offices
Preceded by Geoffrey Crossick	49th Vice-Chancellor of the University of London; 2012–2018	Succeeded by Peter Kopelman
New title	1st Principal of Queen Mary University of London; 1998–2008	Succeeded by Philip Ogden (acting); Simon Gaskell
Government offices
Preceded by	Director General for Knowledge and Innovation of Department for Business, Innovation and Skills; 2008–2012	Succeeded by
Professional and academic associations
Preceded by Venki Ramakrishnan	63rd President of the Royal Society; 2020–2025	Succeeded by Paul Nurse
