= Howard Covington =

British investment banker

Howard Covington is a British investment banker who was a founding shareholder and director of New Star Asset Management. He was also the first non-academic chairman of the Isaac Newton Institute for Mathematical Sciences Management Committee and the inaugural chairman of The Alan Turing Institute.

== Education ==
Covington was born in Eastbourne, England. He attended Eastbourne Grammar School and St John's College, Cambridge. He won a double first in Natural Sciences 1974 and a distinction in Part III Mathematics in 1975.

== Investment banking ==
After leaving university he held various positions: including government service, offshore oil contracting and commercial and investment banking. In 1986 he joined UK investment bank SG Warburg (the investment banking predecessor of UBS), where he became a director. He spent ten years advising public and private companies on strategy, capital raising, public takeovers, acquisitions and disposals. In 1996 he became head of the European investment banking business of US investment bank Wasserstein Perella.

== New Star Asset Management ==
On its foundation in 2000, Mr Covington joined New Star Asset Management as a founder shareholder and director. He became chief executive in 2001. New Star grew from a loss-making start-up with a handful of employees to a profitable mainstream asset manager with £20 billion under management and 400 employees. It was listed on the London stock exchange in 2005 and was sold to Henderson in April 2009.

== The Alan Turing Institute ==
From 2015 to 2022 Covington was the inaugural chairman of The Alan Turing Institute, the UK's national research institute for data science and artificial intelligence established as a joint venture between the Engineering and Physical Sciences Research Council and the universities of Cambridge, Edinburgh, Oxford, UCL and Warwick. The Institute is headquartered in the British Library in London and now has 13 partner universities and more than 400 researchers, students and staff across the disciplines of mathematics, statistics, machine learning, computer science and social science. In 2018, the institute was joined by eight additional university partners: Queen Mary University of London, University of Leeds, University of Manchester, University of Newcastle, University of Southampton, University of Birmingham, University of Exeter and University of Bristol.

== Oxford Smith School ==
In 2025 Covington became chair of the advisory board of the Oxford Smith School [https://www.smithschool.ox.ac.uk/page/advisory-board], having been a board member since 2022. The Smith School is an interdisciplinary research centre within the University of Oxford that serves as a global hub for integrating business, enterprise, economics, law, and environmental scholarship, in order to drive the transition to net-zero emissions and advance the sustainable development goals.

=== ClientEarth ===
From 2018 to 2023 Covington was chair of ClientEarth, an environmental law charity, having been a trustee since 2014. ClientEarth works in Europe, Africa and China writing and enforcing environmental laws and regulations and training environmental judges and prosecutors to protect public health, accelerate the energy transition and preserve bio-diversity.

=== Positions held ===
Covington is, or has been: chair of the management committee of the Isaac Newton Institute for Mathematical Sciences at the University of Cambridge, the UK's national research institute for mathematical sciences (2008 - 2017); a trustee of the Science Museum (2008 - 2016) and a trustee of the Royal Institution (2011 - 2013)~~.~~ He has written on climate change for the Wall Street Journal, the Financial Times, Nature GeoScience and Nature. He is a fellow of the Institute of Physics andan honorary fellow of the Isaac Newton Institute and the Alan Turing Institute.
