= Data literacy =

Transformation of data to understandable forms

Data literacy is the ability to read, understand, create, and communicate data as information. Much like literacy as a general concept, data literacy focuses on the competencies involved in working with data. It is, however, not similar to the ability to read text since it requires certain skills involving reading and understanding data.

Data literacy refers to the ability to understand, interpret, critically evaluate, and effectively communicate data in context to inform decisions and drive action. It is not a technical skill but a fundamental capability for everyone, encompassing the skills and mindset necessary to transform raw data into meaningful insights and apply these insights within real-world scenarios.

In recent years, data literacy has become recognized as an important skill beyond just data scientists or researchers. As data shapes more aspects of daily life, including social media, online shopping, and personal decision making, the ability to interpret and use data helps people make informed choices and participate effectively in a data driven world.

== Background ==
As data collection and data sharing become routine and data analysis and big data become common ideas in the news, business, government and society, it becomes more and more important for students, citizens, and readers to have some data literacy. The concept is associated with data science, which is concerned with data analysis, usually through automated means, and the interpretation and application of the results.Research about data literacy has grown over the years. A study by Nwagwu looked at 997 publications and found that research on data literacy increased between 2005 and 2022.

The idea of data literacy has changed over time, first gaining attention in academic and professional settings before spreading to everyday life. The rise of digital technology, access to large volumes of data, and the growing necessity for critical decision making have all contributed to its importance. Today, data literacy matters in school, at work, and even in daily routine, helping explain why its become such an important and relevant topic.

Data literacy is distinguished from statistical literacy since it involves understanding what data means, including the ability to read graphs and charts as well as draw conclusions from data. Statistical literacy, on the other hand, refers to the "ability to read and interpret summary statistics in everyday media" such as graphs, tables, statements, surveys, and studies.

== Frameworks ==
Recent work has shown the value of using practical framework to develop data literacy. The OODA (Observe, Orient, Decide, Act), is an example, which originated in military strategy is now used to teach data driven thinking and decision making in various settings. These frameworks help people use data literacy to solve real world problems and make informed choices, making the concept more practical and useful.

Recently, a systematic literature review on frameworks and instruments has identified a definitional and theoretical fragmentation of approaches to data literacy and has proposed the COPERDALE framework, a synthesized core-periphery framework for data literacy. The framework identifies a core of fundamental skills and in the outer periphery more context dependent aspects of data literacy.

== Workplace and everyday life ==
Employers across many fields are seeking potential employees who are comfortable working with data. Data literacy is increasingly valued in the workforce, influencing hiring and training practices. Universities and colleges are responding by developing new courses, curricula, and programs focused on building students data literacy skills, preparing them for careers in a data driven economy.

Data literacy is not important only in academic or professional environments; it is also relevant for daily life. People use data skills when planning trips, comparing products online, filtering travel options, or checking personal app statistics. These real world examples show how data literacy helps individuals make more informed decisions and navigate digital platforms.

== Datafication ==
The process of datafication, which is turning more aspects of life into data, has wide reaching effects. Data literacy now means understanding how data shapes online experiences, like algorithmic recommendations, targeted ads, and feedback loops. It also involves awareness of privacy risk, bias in data, and broader social and ethical questions raised by the increased reliance on data for decision making.

== Role of libraries and librarians ==
As guides for finding and using information, librarians lead workshops on data literacy for students and researchers, and also work on developing their own data literacy skills.

A set of core competencies and contents that can be used as an adaptable common framework of reference in library instructional programs across institutions and disciplines has been proposed.

Resources created by librarians include MIT's Data Management and Publishing tutorial, the EDINA Research Data Management Training (MANTRA), the University of Edinburgh's Data Library and the University of Minnesota libraries' Data Management Course for Structural Engineers.

== See also ==
- Information literacies
- Information literacy
- Media literacy
- Numeracy
- Statistical literacy
- Transliteracy
