= Chris Holmes (mathematician) =

British statistician

Christopher C. Holmes
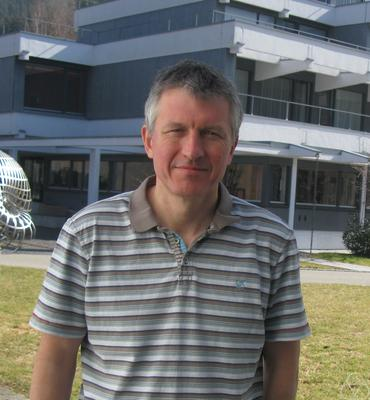
- Chris Holmes
- Education: Imperial College London
- Scientific career
- Fields: Biostatistics
- Workplaces: University of Oxford
- Thesis: Bayesian methods for nonlinear classification and regression (2000)
- Doctoral advisor: Bani K. Mallick

Christopher C. Holmes is a British statistician. He has held the position of Professor of Biostatistics in Genomics in the Nuffield Department of Clinical Medicine and the Department of Statistics at the University of Oxford since September 2014, a post that carries with it a Fellowship of St Anne's College, Oxford. Previously he was titular Professor of Biostatistics and a Fellow of Lincoln College. After working in industry he completed his doctorate in Bayesian statistics at Imperial College, London, supervised by Adrian Smith.

Holmes's research interests are in spatial statistics, Bayesian non-parametrics and statistical problems in genetics. He is one of the co-founders of the Oxford-Man Institute. Holmes was awarded the 2003 Research Prize and the 2009 Guy Medal in Bronze by the Royal Statistical Society.
