= Low-protein diet =

Diet in which people decrease their intake of protein

A low-protein diet is a diet in which people decrease their intake of protein. A low-protein diet is used as a therapy for inherited metabolic disorders, such as phenylketonuria and homocystinuria, and can also be used to treat kidney or liver disease. There is no uniform definition of what constitutes a low-protein diet, because the amount and composition of protein vary by medical condition, nutritional status, and clinical goal. For example, the amount and composition of protein used for an individual with phenylketonuria may differ substantially from that used for homocystinuria, tyrosinemia, chronic kidney disease, or liver disease.

== History ==
By studying the composition of food in the local population in Germany, Carl von Voit established a standard of 118 grams of protein per day. Russell Henry Chittenden showed that less than half that amount was needed to maintain good health.

== Protein requirement ==
The daily requirement for humans to remain in nitrogen balance is relatively small. The median human adult requirement for good quality protein is approximately 0.65 gram per kilogram body weight per day and the 97.5th percentile is 0.83 grams per kilogram body weight per day. Children require more protein, depending on the growth phase. A 70 kg adult human who was in the middle of the range would require approximately 45 grams of protein per day to be in nitrogen balance. This would represent less than 10% of kilocalories in a notional 2,200 kilocalorie ration. William Cumming Rose and his team studied the essential amino acids, helping to define minimum amounts needed for normal health. For adults, the recommended minimum amounts of each essential amino acid vary from 4 to 39 milligrams per kilogram of body weight per day. To be of good quality, protein only needs to come from a wide variety of foods; there is neither a need to mix animal and plant food together nor a need to complement specific plant foods, such as rice and beans. The notion that such specific combinations of plant protein need to be made to give good quality protein stems from the book Diet for a Small Planet. Plant proteins are often described as incomplete, suggesting that they lack one or more of the essential amino acids. Apart from rare examples, such as taro, each plant provides an amount of all the essential amino acids. However, the relative abundance of the essential amino acids is more variable in plants than that found in animals, which tend to be very similar in essential amino acid abundance, and this has led to the misconception that plant proteins are deficient in some way.

== Chronic kidney disease ==
In chronic kidney disease (CKD), low-protein and very-low-protein diets form part of medical nutrition therapy for selected metabolically stable adults who are not on dialysis. Targets vary between guidelines.

The 2024 Kidney Disease: Improving Global Outcomes (KDIGO) guideline suggests:

- 0.8 g/kg body weight per day for adults with CKD G3–G5;
- avoiding intakes above 1.3 g/kg/day in adults at risk of progression;
- a very-low-protein diet of 0.3–0.4 g/kg/day with essential amino acid or ketoacid analogue supplementation in selected adults at risk of kidney failure who are willing and able to comply, under close supervision.

The same guideline advises against protein restriction in metabolically unstable patients and in children with CKD (citing growth risk), and notes that older adults with frailty or sarcopenia may instead require higher protein and calorie intake.

The 2020 KDOQI nutrition guideline recommends 0.55–0.60 g/kg/day for metabolically stable adults with CKD stages 3–5 not on dialysis and without diabetes, or 0.28–0.43 g/kg/day combined with keto acid or amino acid analogues. For patients with concurrent diabetes, 0.6–0.8 g/kg/day may be prescribed under close supervision.

== Low-protein vs calorie restriction ==
Calorie restriction has been demonstrated to increase the life span and decrease the age-associated morbidity of many experimental animals. Increases in longevity or reductions in age-associated morbidity have also been shown for model systems where protein or specific amino acids have been reduced. In particular, experiments in model systems in rats, mice, and Drosophila fruit flies have shown increases in life-span with reduced protein intake comparable to that for calorie restriction. Restriction of the amino acid methionine, which is required to initiate protein synthesis, is sufficient to extend lifespan. Restriction of the branched-chain amino acids is sufficient to extend the lifespan of Drosophila fruit flies and male mice.

Some of the most dramatic effects of calorie restriction are on metabolic health, promoting leanness, decreasing blood sugar and increasing insulin sensitivity. Low-protein diets mimic many of the effects of calorie restriction but may engage different metabolic mechanisms. Low protein diets rapidly reduce fat and restores normal insulin sensitivity to diet-induced obese mice. Specifically restricting consumption of the three branched-chain amino acids leucine, isoleucine and valine is sufficient to promote leanness and improve regulation of blood glucose. A 2022 randomized-controlled clinical trial showed that protein restriction (PR) improves multiple markers of metabolic health, such as reducing adiposity and improving insulin sensitivity.

The diets of humans living in some of the Blue Zones, regions of enhanced numbers of centenarians and reduced age-associated morbidity, contain less than 10% of energy from protein, although reports on all the Blue Zones are not available. None of the diets in these regions is completely based on plants, but plants form the bulk of the food eaten. Although it has been speculated that some of these populations are under calorie restriction, this is contentious as their smaller size is consistent with the lower food consumption.

== Low-protein and osteoporosis ==
The effect of protein on osteoporosis and risk of bone fracture is complex. Calcium loss from bone occurs at protein intake below requirement when individuals are in negative protein balance, suggesting that too little protein is dangerous for bone health. IGF-1, which contributes to muscle growth, also contributes to bone growth, and IGF-1 is modulated by protein intake.

However, at high protein levels, a net loss of calcium may occur through the urine in neutralizing the acid formed from the deamination and subsequent metabolism of methionine and cysteine. Large prospective cohort studies have shown a slight increase in risk of bone fracture when the quintile of highest protein consumption is compared to the quintile of lowest protein consumption. In these studies, the trend is also seen for animal protein but not plant protein, but the individuals differ substantially in animal protein intake and very little in plant protein intake. As protein consumption increases, calcium uptake from the gut is enhanced. Normal increases in calcium uptake occur with increased protein in the range 0.8 grams to 1.5 grams of protein per kilogram body weight per day. However, calcium uptake from the gut does not compensate for calcium loss in the urine at protein consumption of 2 grams of protein per kilogram of body weight. Calcium is not the only ion that neutralizes the sulfate from protein metabolism, and overall buffering and renal acid load also includes anions such as bicarbonate, organic ions, phosphorus and chloride as well as cations such as ammonium, titratable acid, magnesium, potassium and sodium.

The study of potential renal acid load (PRAL) suggests that increased consumption of fruits, vegetables and cooked legumes increases the ability of the body to buffer acid from protein metabolism, because they contribute to a base forming potential in the body due to their relative concentrations of proteins and ions. However, not all plant material is base forming, for example, nuts, grains and grain products add to the acid load.

== See also ==
- Essential amino acid
- High protein diet
- List of diets
