= Maxine Pfannkuch =

New Zealand statistics educator

Maxine Jeanette Pfannkuch
- Citizenship: New Zealand
- Occupation: statistics educator
- Years active: 1999 - present
- Known for: Worked on New Zealand national statistics curriculum

Maxine Jeanette Pfannkuch is a New Zealand statistics educator, known for her work reforming the New Zealand national statistics curriculum. She is an associate professor in the department of statistics of the University of Auckland, and the former editor-in-chief of the Statistics Education Research Journal.

== Education ==
Pfannkuch taught at the high school level beginning in 1972, and was head of mathematics at Avondale College, Auckland from 1983 to 1987. After working as an advisor to the Ministry of Education and as an instructor at the Auckland College of Education, she returned to graduate study in 1994 and earned her Ph.D. in 1999 from the University of Auckland under the supervision of Chris J Wild. Her Ph.D. thesis was titled Characteristics of statistical thinking in empirical enquiry.

She became editor-in-chief of the Statistics Education Research Journal in 2015.

== Recognition ==
Pfannkuch is an Elected Member of the International Statistical Institute. She is the 2015 winner of the Campbell Award of the New Zealand Statistical Association.
