= National digital identity systems =

Digital identity at a national scale

Many nations have implemented, are implementing, or have proposed nationwide digital identity systems.

Although many facets of digital identity are universal owing in part to the ubiquity of the Internet, some regional variations exist due to specific laws, practices and government services that are in place. For example, digital identity can use services that validate driving licences, passports and other physical documents online to help improve the quality of a digital identity. Also, strict policies against money laundering mean that some services, such as money transfers need a stricter level of validation of digital identity.

Digital identity in the national sense can mean a combination of single sign on, and/or validation of assertions by trusted authorities (generally the government).

== General characteristics ==
Potential benefits of a national digital identity system include:

- More convenience
- Less costs
- Greater access to services
- More privacy and security

However, a national digital identity system reduces anonymity and puts people at risk of data breaches. They may also be prone to human rights abuses.

== Asia ==
=== Bhutan ===
Bhutan has implemented two previous NDI systems based upon blockchain technology with its first digital citizen being the Bhutan Crown Prince, Jigme Namgyel Wangchuck.

In October 2025, the newest system based upon Ethereum was announced by the Bhutan Crown Prince Jigme Namgyel Wangchuck, Vitalik Buterin, and Aya Miyuguchi to be released in early 2026.

=== China ===
National online identity authentication is an online real-name authentication method in the People's Republic of China. It is promoted by the Ministry of Public Security and the Cyberspace Administration of China.

=== India ===
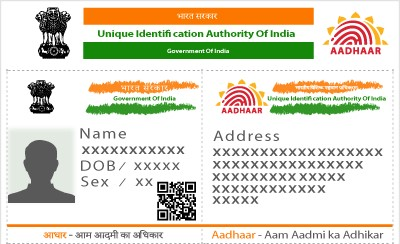
An example of an Aadhaar card

In India, the Aadhaar card is used as a digital ID service, mainly for government institutions.

=== Iran ===
The Iranian identity card is ubiquitous.

=== Singapore ===
Singapore's SingPass is being extended to National Digital Identity for government services, though the intent is to extend it to private institutions. The corporate login version is called CorpPass.

== Europe ==
=== European Union ===
On June 3, 2021, the European Commission proposed a framework for a European Digital Identity. It is planned to be available to citizens, residents, and business within the EU. Though it should be suitable for online and offline private and public services, it can be used by participants for personal identification or to provide confirmation about specific personal information. Benefits included are the EU wide recognition of every digital identity card, a secure way on how to control the amount of data and information the user wants to share with the services as well as the simple operation via digital wallets using several mobile devices.

=== Estonia ===
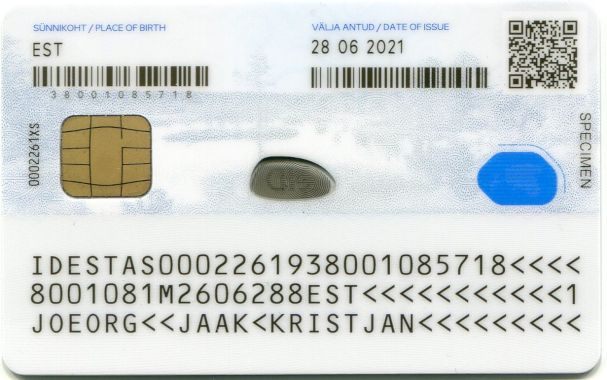
An example of an Estonian identity card from 2021

The Estonian identity card can be used by governments and some third parties for authentication.

=== Finland ===
One of the earliest digital ID cards were issued in Finland in December 1999 to Prime Minister Paavo Lipponen.

=== Germany ===
There is an online ID card available in Germany. Users can identify themselves securely on the internet, at vending machines or several citizen terminals. Thereby business and authority matters can be easily worked out electronically to save time, cost and money. In the framework of a competition called "Schaufenster Sichere Digitale Identitäten", the German Federal Ministry of economy and energy created a project, called "IDunion". This project was launched on April 1, 2021, and aims to create the opportunity for inhabitants to get easier access to education, mobility, e-government, industry, health care and much more.

=== Ireland ===
MyGovID is the online identity system for interactions with agencies of the Government of Ireland such as pension, maternity, and welfare payments. It was launched on 23 March, 2017 and is operated by the Department of Social Protection.

=== Italy ===
The Sistema Pubblico di Identità Digitale (SPID) can be used as a digital ID for public and private institutions.

=== Monaco ===
Since June 2021, Monégasque citizens and residents can get digital IDs for public institutions and for access to telecom or electricity services.

=== Ukraine ===
Ukraine introduced online ID cards in April 2020, and fully legalized the use of online ID documents on August 23, 2021. Ukrainian citizens can use an app called "Diia" for identification purposes. Every user will be able to choose whether to use the paper documents or digital ones as for authorities will not be able to demand paper documents from citizens if they have digital ones. Digital identity can be used not only for provision of public and government services but also to receive deliveries, confirm age in supermarkets and open new bank accounts.

=== United Kingdom ===
The United Kingdom's system GOV.UK Verify went live on 24 May 2016. In 2022, the UK government announced that GOV.UK Verify would be closing down, becoming unusable by April 2023.

The system provides a single login for digital government services which verifies the user's identity in 15 minutes. It allowed users to choose one of several identity verification services, and provided access to 22 digital government services.

== Australia ==
In Australia, myGov/myID and Australia Post DigitaliD provide a means of single sign on. myGov only supports government agencies, whereas Australia Post's DigitaliD solution supports private institutions.

== Caribbean ==
In the Caribbean represent particular challenges due to the region's geographies, political context, social inequalities and cultural diversity. In the case of Jamaica and the Dominican Republic, Digital ID national systems have been particularly illustrious of pressing issues such as the reinforcement of discriminatory biases and severe limitations to the right to privacy. Regardless of claims over these issues by civil society organisations and social movements, policies have progressed in both countries.

== United States ==
Although no ubiquitous digital identity service exists, U.S. Social Security numbers act as a national identity number and can be validated by authorized private institutions using the American government's Social Security Number Validation Service.
