= AP Statistics =

College-level high school statistics course

Advanced Placement (AP) Statistics (also known as AP Stats) is a college-level high school statistics course offered in the United States through the College Board's Advanced Placement program. This course is equivalent to a one semester, non-calculus-based introductory college statistics course and is normally offered to sophomores, juniors and seniors in high school.

One of the College Board's more recent additions, the AP Statistics exam was first administered in May 1997 to supplement the AP program's math offerings, which had previously consisted of only AP Calculus AB and BC. In the United States, enrollment in AP Statistics classes has increased at a higher rate than in any other AP class.

Students may receive college credit or upper-level college course placement upon passing the three-hour exam ordinarily administered in May. The exam consists of a multiple-choice section and a free-response section that are both 90 minutes long. Each section is weighted equally in determining the students' composite scores.

== History ==
The Advanced Placement program has offered students the opportunity to pursue college-level courses while in high school. Along with the Educational Testing Service, the College Board administered the first AP Statistics exam in May 1997. The course was first taught to students in the 1996-1997 academic year. Prior to that, the only mathematics courses offered in the AP program included AP Calculus AB and BC. Students who didn't have a strong background in college-level math, however, found the AP Calculus program inaccessible and sometimes declined to take a math course in their senior year. Since the number of students required to take statistics in college is almost as large as the number of students required to take calculus, the College Board decided to add an introductory statistics course to the AP program. Since the prerequisites for such a program doesn't require mathematical concepts beyond those typically taught in a second-year algebra course, the AP program's math offerings became accessible to a much wider audience of high school students. The AP Statistics program addressed a practical need as well since the number of students enrolling in majors that use statistics has grown. A total of 7,667 students took the exam during the first administration, the highest number of students to take an AP exam in its first year. Since then, the number of students taking the exam rapidly grew to 98,033 in 2007, making it one of the 10 most popular AP exams.

== Course ==
If the course is provided by their school, students normally take AP Statistics in their junior or senior year and may decide to take it concurrently with a pre-calculus course. This offering is intended to imitate a one-semester, non-calculus based college statistics course, but high schools can decide to offer the course over one semester, two trimesters, or a full academic year.

The six-member AP Statistics Test Development Committee is responsible for developing the curriculum. Appointed by the College Board, the committee consists of three college statistics teachers and three high school statistics teachers who are typically asked to serve for terms of three years.

=== Curriculum ===
Emphasis is placed not on actual arithmetic computation, but rather on conceptual understanding and interpretation. The course curriculum is organized around four basic skills; the first involves selecting statistical methods and covers 15–23% of the exam. Students are expected to choose methods for analyzing data for statistical inference. The second skill involves data analysis and covers 15-23% of the exam. Students must describe patterns, associations, and relationships in data. The third theme involves probability and simulations. This theme covers 30–40% of the exam. The fourth theme, which covers 25–35% of the exam, involves statistical argumentation by explaining or justifying conclusions using evidence from data or statistical inference.

There are nine units of AP Statistics. The percentage indicates the portion of the multiple-choice section of the exam focused on each content area.

Unit	Percent
Exploring One-Variable Data	15–23%
Exploring Two-Variable Data	5–7%
Collecting Data	12–15%
Probability, Random Variables, and Probability Distributions	10–20%
Sampling Distributions	7–12%
Inference for Categorical Data: Proportions	12–15%
Inference for Quantitative Data: Means	10–18%
Inference for Categorical Data: Chi-Square	2–5%
Inference for Quantitative Data: Slopes	2–5%

== Exam ==
Along with the course curriculum, the exam is developed by the AP Statistics Test Development Committee as well. With the help of other college professors, the committee creates a large pool of possible questions that is pre-tested with college students taking statistics courses. The test is then refined to an appropriate level of difficulty and clarity. Afterwards, the Educational Testing Service is responsible for printing and administering the exam.

=== Structure ===
Students are expected to be able to interpret graphs, such as this histogram, and analyze its characteristics, including center, spread, shape, outliers, clusters, and gaps.

The exam is offered every year in May. Students are not expected to memorize any formulas; rather, a list of common statistical formulas related to descriptive statistics, probability, and inferential statistics is provided. Moreover, tables for the normal, Student's t and chi-squared distributions are given as well. Students are also expected to use graphing calculators with statistical capabilities. The exam is three hours long with ninety minutes allotted to complete each of its two sections: multiple-choice and free-response. The multiple-choice portion of the exam consists of forty questions with five possible answers each. The free-response section contains six open-ended questions that are often long and divided into multiple parts. The first five of these questions may require twelve minutes each to answer and normally relate to one topic or category. The sixth question consists of a broad-ranging investigative task and may require approximately twenty-five minutes to answer.

=== Grading ===
The multiple-choice section is scored immediately after the exam by computer. One point is awarded for each correct answer, no points are credited or deducted for unanswered questions, and points are no longer deducted for having an incorrect answer.

Students' answers to the free-response section are reviewed in early June by readers that include high school and college statistics teachers gathered in a designated location. The readers use a pre-made rubric to assess the answers and normally grade only one question in a given exam. Each question is graded on a scale from 0 to 4, with a 4 representing the most complete response. Communication and clarity in the answers receive a lot of emphasis in the grading.

Both sections are weighted equally when the composite score is calculated. The composite score is reported on a scale from 1 to 5, with a score of 5 being the highest possible.

=== Grade distributions ===
Final Score	1	2	3	4	5	% of scores 3 or higher	Mean score	Standard deviation	Number of students
2001	21.10%	19.10%	24.90%	23.40%	11.50%	59.80%	2.85	1.31	41,034
2002	23.90%	19.20%	23.90%	21.80%	11.20%	56.90%	2.77	1.33	49,824
2003	18.60%	19.50%	26.40%	22.30%	13.20%	61.90%	2.92	1.30	58,230
2004	20.30%	19.80%	24.80%	22.40%	12.60%	59.80%	2.85	1.28	65,878
2005	20.10%	19.20%	25.30%	22.80%	12.60%	60.70%	2.88	1.31	76,786
2006	21.60%	18.30%	25.30%	22.20%	12.60%	60.20%	2.86	1.32	88,237
2007	24.10%	17.10%	25.40%	21.50%	11.90%	58.80%	2.8	1.34	98,033
2008	21.80%	18.80%	23.70%	22.70%	12.90%	59.30%	2.86	1.34	108,284
2009	22.20%	19.10%	24.20%	22.30%	12.30%	58.80%	2.83	1.33	116,876
2010	23.10%	18.20%	23.50%	22.40%	12.80%	58.70%	2.84	1.35	129,899
2011	23.50%	17.60%	25.00%	21.40%	12.40%	58.80%	2.82	1.34	142,910
2012	22.80%	18.00%	25.60%	20.90%	12.50%	59.20%	2.83	1.33	153,859
2013	23.40%	18.80%	24.80%	20.30%	12.80%	57.90%	2.8	1.34	169,508
2014	22.60%	17.80%	24.50%	20.90%	14.30%	59.60%	2.86	1.36	184,173
2015	23.60%	18.60%	25.20%	19.10%	13.40%	57.80%	2.8	1.35	195,526
2016	23.50%	15.50%	24.90%	21.70%	14.30%	60.90%	2.88	1.37	206,563
2017	25.50%	20.20%	24.80%	15.90%	13.60%	54.30%	2.72	1.36	215,840
2018	23.40%	15.90%	24.90%	21.20%	14.60%	60.70%	2.88	1.37	222,501
2019	21.10%	19.70%	26.70%	18.00%	14.50%	59.20%	2.85	1.33	219,392
2020	18.30%	21.70%	23.10%	20.70%	16.20%	60.00%	2.95	1.34	187,741
2021	24.90%	17.20%	21.80%	19.90%	16.20%	57.90%	2.85	1.41	184,111
2022	23.10%	16.50%	23.40%	22.20%	14.80%	60.50%	2.89	1.37	216,968
2023	23.80%	16.20%	22.70%	22.20%	15.10%	60.00%	2.89	1.39	242,929
2024	22.30%	15.90%	22.50%	21.80%	17.50%	61.80%	2.96	1.40	252,914
2025	23.70%	15.90%	21.90%	21.40%	17.00%	60.30%	2.92	1.41	266,791
2026	21%	17%	22%	23%	17%	62%			281,000

== See also ==
- Statistics
- Glossary of probability and statistics
- Statistics education
