= Knowledge Quarter, London =

Innovation district in London, England

Coordinates: 51.529°N 0.121°W

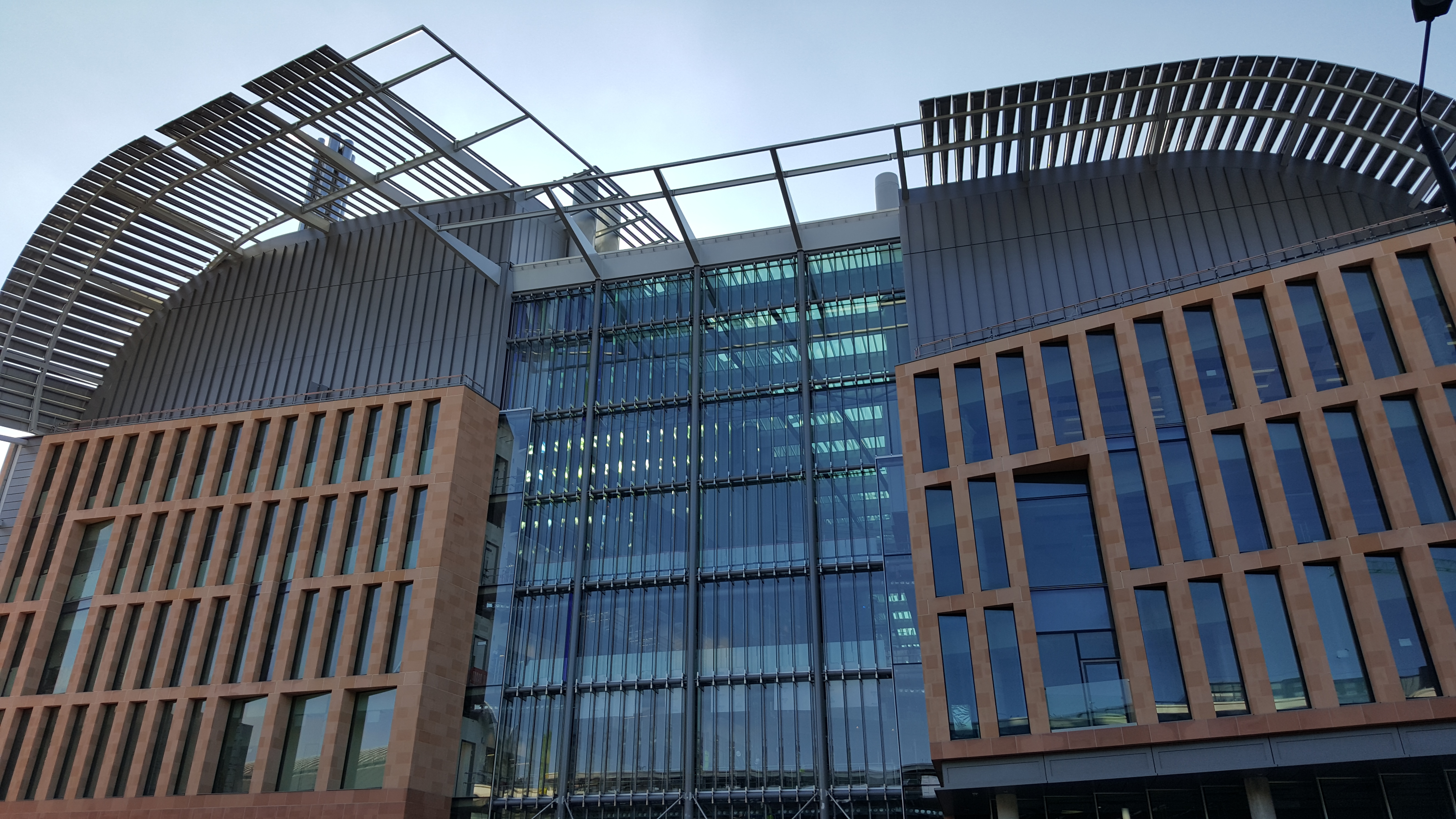
The Francis Crick Institute building, part of the Knowledge Quarter

The Knowledge Quarter (KQ) is an innovation district, situated in a one-mile radius of King's Cross, containing many academic, cultural, research, scientific and media organisations.

The partners of the Knowledge Quarter include The British Library, The British Museum, Google, The Alan Turing Institute, Francis Crick Institute, Springer Nature, The Wellcome Trust, Recursion, Paul Hamlyn Foundation, Royal College of Physicians, UCL, SOAS, University of London and Working Men's College amongst others.

The Knowledge Quarter functions as a membership organisation led by Jodie Eastwood, the Chief Executive, and is a hub for innovation, culture and cross-sectoral partnerships and growth.
