= Bone health =

Health of the skeleton

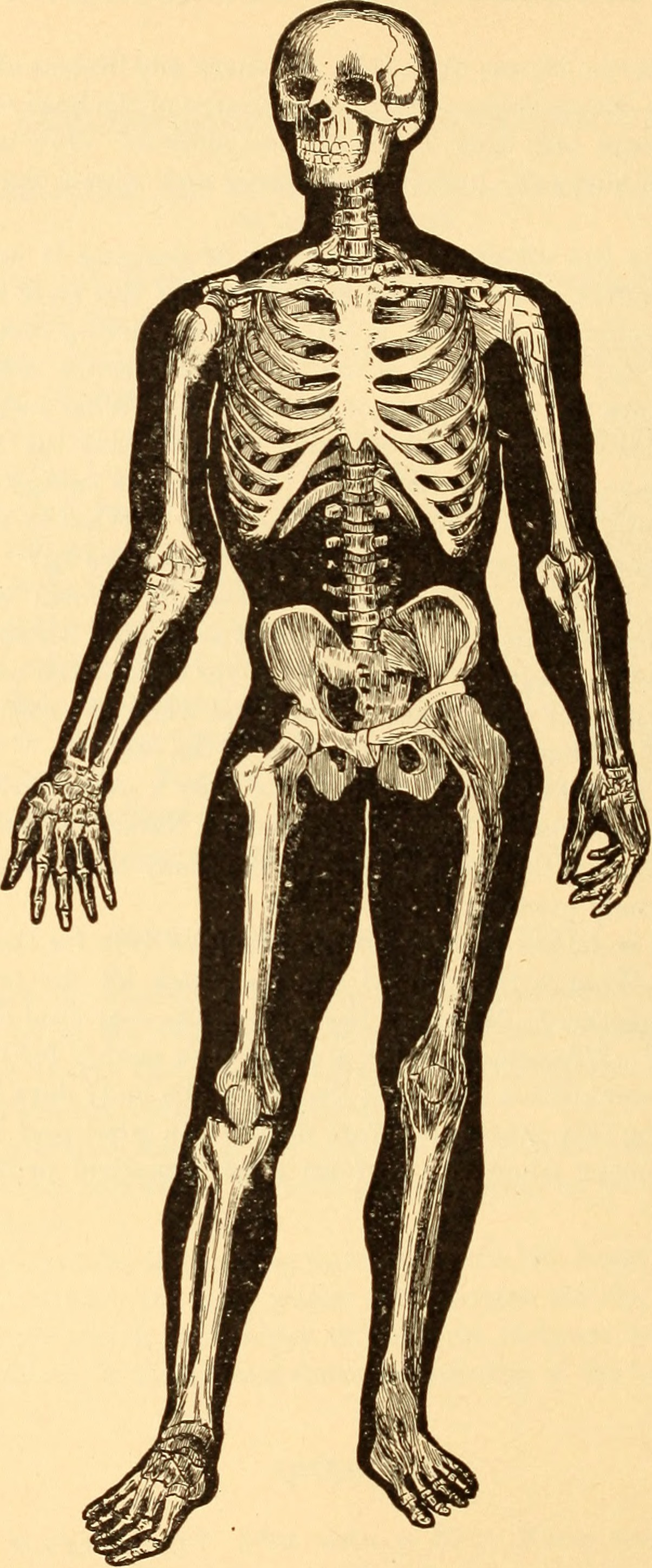
Teaching aid for the human skeleton, 1900

Bone health refers to the overall condition and strength of the human skeletal system, which is crucial for maintaining mobility, preventing fractures, and supporting overall well-being throughout life. It is influenced by various factors, including genetics, nutrition, physical activity, and hormonal balance. Optimal bone health is characterized by adequate bone mineral density (BMD) and proper bone microarchitecture, which together contribute to bone strength. Osteoporosis, a skeletal disorder characterized by compromised bone strength and increased risk of fractures, is a major concern in bone health, particularly among older adults. Maintaining good bone health involves a combination of adequate calcium and vitamin D intake, regular weight-bearing exercise, and avoiding risk factors such as smoking and excessive alcohol consumption. Recent research has also highlighted the potential role of the gut microbiome in bone health, suggesting a complex interplay between various physiological systems in maintaining skeletal integrity.

The human skeletal system is a dynamic structure that consistently works in balance with the rest of the body. In addition to supporting and giving structure to the body, a bone is the major reservoir for many minerals and compounds essential for maintaining a healthy pH balance. The deterioration of the body with age renders the elderly particularly susceptible to and affected by poor bone health. Illnesses like osteoporosis, characterized by weakening of the bone's structural matrix, increases the risk of hip-fractures and other life-changing secondary symptoms. In 2010, over 258,000 people aged 65 and older were admitted to the hospital for hip fractures. Incidence of hip fractures is expected to rise by 12% in America, with a projected 289,000 admissions in the year 2030. Other sources estimate up to 1.5 million Americans will have an osteoporotic-related fracture each year. The cost of treating these people is also enormous, in 1991 Medicare spent an estimated $2.9 billion for treatment and out-patient care of hip fractures, this number can only be expected to rise.

== Amino acid metabolism ==
When more sulfur containing amino acids, methionine and cystine, are consumed than the body can use for growth and repair, they are broken down yielding sulfate, or sulfuric acid among other products. Animal foods such as meat, dairy, and eggs are high in protein and "dietary animal protein intake is highly correlated with renal net acid excretion". Research dating back to the early 1900s has shown correlations between high protein diets and increased acid excretion. One measure of the acidic or basic effects foods have in the body is Potential Renal Acid Load (PRAL). Cheeses with protein content of 15 g protein/100g or higher have a high PRAL value of 23.6 mEq/100 g edible portion. Meats, fish, other cheeses and flour or noodles all have a PRAL around 8.0 mEq/100 g edible portion, where fruits and vegetables actually have a negative PRAL.

In healthy adults, bone undergoes constant repair and renewal. New bone is deposited by osteoblast cells and resorbed or destroyed by osteoclast cells. This addition and subtraction of bone usually yields no net change in the overall mass of the skeleton, but the turnover process can be significantly affected by pH.

=== Bone mineral density ===
Bone mineral density (BMD) is a measure commonly used to quantify bone health. A lower BMD value indicates an increased risk of an osteoporosis or a fracture. There is a large range of factors influencing BMD. Protein consumption has shown to be beneficial for bone density by providing amino acid substrates necessary for bone matrix formation. It is also thought that blood concentration of the bone formation stimulant, Insulin-like Growth Factor-I (IGF-I), is increased from high protein consumption and parathyroid hormone (PTH), a bone resorption stimulant, is decreased. Although protein has shown to be beneficial for increasing bone mass, or bone mineral density, there is no significant association between protein intake and fracture incidence. In other words, a low BMD can be predictive of osteoporosis and increased fracture risk, but a higher BMD does not necessarily mean better bone health. High BMD is also correlated with other health issues. For example, a higher BMD has also been associated with increased risk of breast cancer.

=== Signs and diagnosis of osteoporosis ===
Osteoporosis is a condition in which the bones become weaker due to losing bone mass or density, these bones then become more fragile which often leads to fractures of the bone. Osteoporosis is often asymptomatic until a fracture occurs. Common indicators include back pain, loss of height, a stooped posture, and fractures resulting from minor falls or movements.

==== Diagnosis ====
A bone mineral density test, such as dual-energy X-ray absorptiometry, is commonly used to assess bone strength, particularly in the hip and spine. Screening is generally recommended for women aged 65 and older, postmenopausal women with risk factors, and some men based on clinical evaluation.

=== Acid–base homeostasis ===
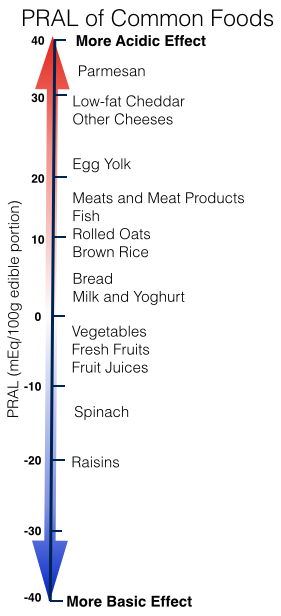
PRAL of Common Foods

Most metabolic processes have a specific and narrow range of pH where operation is possible, multiple regulatory systems are in place to maintain homeostasis. Fluctuations away from optimal operating pH can slow or impair reactions and possibly cause damage to cellular structures or proteins. To maintain homeostasis the body may excrete excess acid or base through the urine, via gas exchange in the lungs, or buffer it in the blood. The bicarbonate buffering system of blood plasma effectively holds a steady pH and helps to hold extracellular pH around 7.35. The kidneys are responsible for the majority of acid-base regulation but can excrete urine no lower than a pH of 5. This means that a 330mL can of cola, for example, usually ranging in pH from 2.8 to 3.2, would need to be diluted 100 fold before being excreted. Instead of producing 33L of urine from one can of cola, the body relies on buffer to neutralize the acid. Systemic acidosis can be the result of multiple factors, not just diet. Anaerobic exercise, diabetes, AIDS, aging, menopause, inflammation, infections, tumours, and other wounds and fractures all contribute to acidosis. Blood has an average pH of 7.40 but interstitial fluid can vary. Interstitial pH of the skin, for example, is ~7.1. There is no data available for bone.

=== Homocysteine ===
Homocysteine, a non-protein amino acid and analogue to the protein amino acid cystine, has been shown to have negative effects on bone health. Higher homocysteine concentrations are likely a result of folate, vitamin B_{12} B_{6} deficiencies. In addition, it was found that homocysteine concentration was significantly affected by physical activity. The stimulation of the skeleton through physical activity promotes positive bone remodelling and decreases levels of homocysteine, independently from nutritional intake. Four methods have been proposed regarding the interaction of homocysteine and bone; increase in osteoclast activity, decrease in osteoblast activity, decrease in bone blood flow, and direct action of homocysteine on bone matrix. Homocysteine inhibits lysyl oxidase which is responsible for post-translational modifications of collagen, a key component to bone structure

=== Osteoclast cells ===
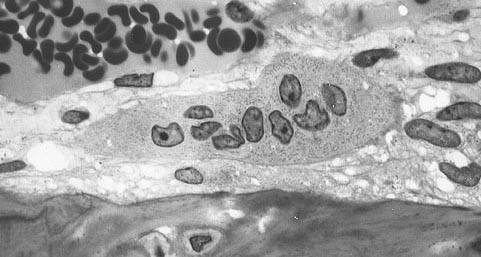
Light micrograph of an osteoclast displaying typical distinguishing characteristics: a large cell with multiple nuclei and a "foamy" cytosol.

Osteoclasts are located on the surface of bones and form resorption pits by excreting H+ to the bone surface removing hydroxyapatite, multiple bone minerals, and organic components: collagen and dentin. The purpose of bone resorption is to release calcium to the blood stream for various life processes. These resorption pits are visible under electron microscopy and distinctive trails are formed from prolonged resorption. Osteoclasts have shown to be "absolutely dependent on extracellular acidification". A drop in pH of <0.1 units can cause a 100% increase in osteoclast cell activity, this effect persists with prolonged acidosis with no desensitization, "amplifying the effects of modest pH differences". Osteoclast cells show little or no activity at pH 7.4 and are most active at pH 6.8 but can be further stimulated by other factors such as parathyroid hormone.

=== Osteoblast cells ===
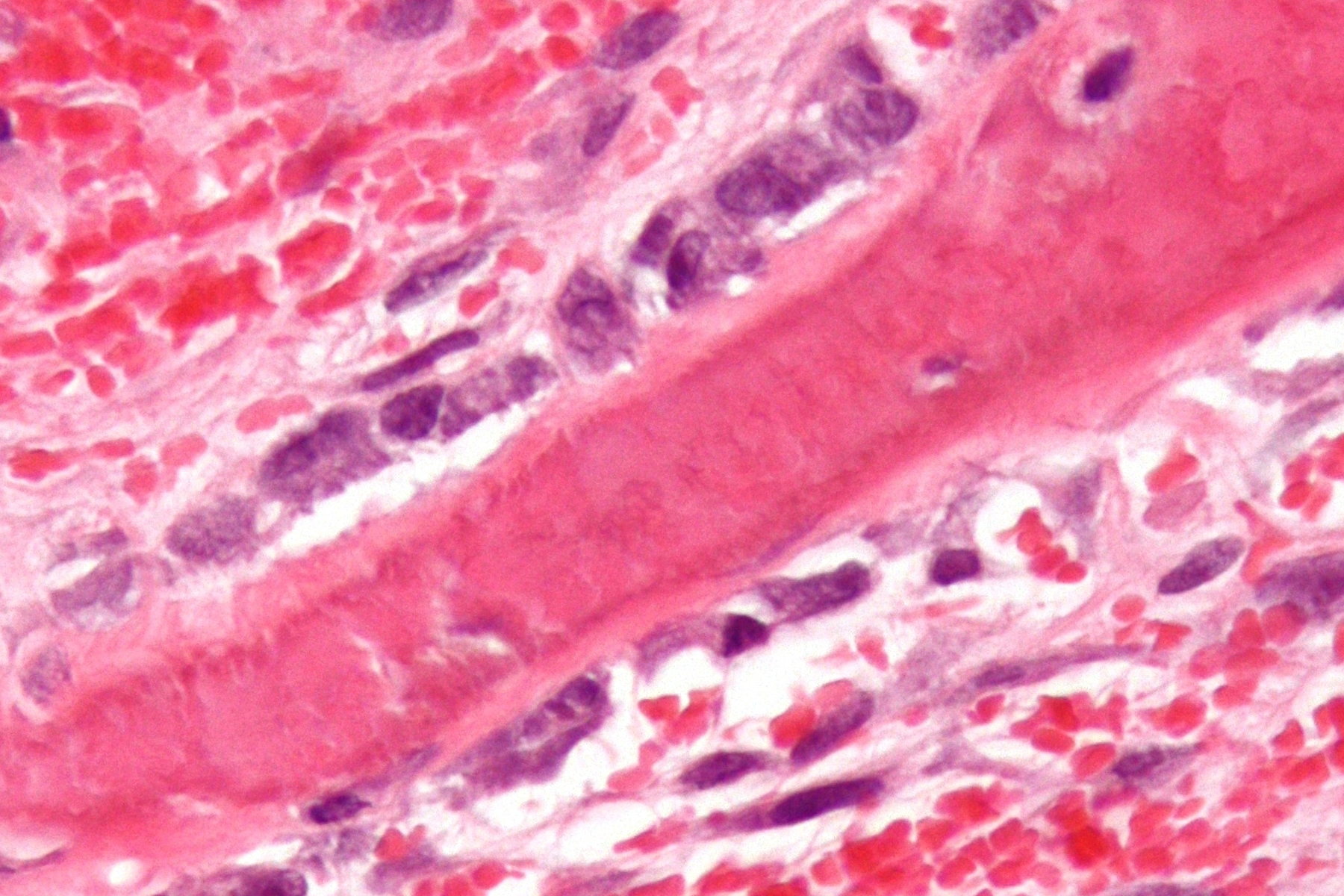
Osteoblast Cells

Osteoblast are responsible for the mineralization and construction of bone matrix. They are responsible for the formation or production of bone tissue. The origin of the osteoblasts and osteoclasts is from primitive precursor cells found in bone marrow. Like osteoclast cells, osteoblast cell activity is directly related to extracellular pH mirroring of osteoclast activity. At pH 7.4, where osteoclasts are inactive, osteoblast are at peak activity. Likewise, at pH 6.9 osteoblast activity is non-existent. The hormone estrogen is also important for osteoblast regulation. In postmenopausal women estrogen levels are decreased which has negative effects on bone remodeling. Homocysteine further exacerbates this problem by reducing estrogen receptor α mRNA transcription. Thus reducing any beneficial effect that estrogen plays on bone remodeling.

== Bone balance ==
Acidosis inhibits bone osteoblast matrix mineralization with reciprocal effect on osteoclast activation. The combined responses of these cells to acidosis maximizes the availability of hydroxyl ions in solution that can be used to buffer protons. The utilization of bone to buffer even a small percentage of daily acid production can lead to significant loss of bone mass in the course of a decade. Additionally, as the body ages there is a steady decline in renal function. Metabolic acidosis can become more severe as kidney function weakens, and the body will depend more heavily on bone and blood to maintain acid-base homeostasis.

=== Low BMD ===
Bone Mineral Density (BMD) tends to peak at a young age. When children are younger, they start building up their BMD through their nutrition and through exercise. BMD peaks at around 12.5 years old for girls and around 14 years old for boys. It could be caused by a deficiency in calcium or Vitamin D. Calcium is the main nutrient for bone health. It aids in the structure and density of the bone. Low BMD could be caused by the children not getting the proper exercise for adequate bone growth. Researchers suggest that children should get 20 minutes of vigorous activity 3 to 5 days a week to promote an increase in BMD. Jumping for about 5 minutes a day also stimulates an increase in BMD. Researchers did a 10-year study on the effects of vigorous intensity activity and their bone health/strength. They studied 300 boys and girls. They found that in boys going through puberty (ages 11-13), they experienced a greater bone mass growth. Their bone mass increased during this time because their bones are not ready for the mechanical stress from them growing. However, that is how the bones grow stronger and why their BMD increases. Too much stress on the bones could cause BMD to decrease. Low BMD is dangerous because it can cause disorders inside the bone as the children grow and get older. These disorders can cause the bone to ossify, become brittle, fragile, more easily prone to fractures, and weak. Some of these disorders include osteopenia, osteoporosis, and scoliosis. Scoliosis is very common in children. Low BMD plays a role in the child's scoliosis. When their bone density is low, there is a higher risk of microfractures in the vertebrae causing the spine to curve and bend. These curves and bends cause pressure onto the vertebra which could cause progression of scoliosis. When the spine is in this shape, it makes it very difficult for the children to play and exercise. This will also improve the severity of the scoliosis.

== Diet ==
There is no one food or nutrient capable of providing adequate bone health on its own. Instead, a balanced diet sufficient in fruits and vegetables for their vitamins, minerals, and alkalinizing substrates is thought to be most beneficial. High protein diets supply larger amounts of amino acids that could be degraded to acidic compounds. Protein consumption above the Recommended Dietary Allowance is also known to be beneficial to calcium utilization. Overall, it is understood that high-protein diets have a net benefit for bone health because changes in IGF-I and PTH concentrations outweigh the negative effects of metabolic acid production. The source of protein, plant or animal, does not matter in terms of acid produced from amino acid metabolism. Any differences in methionine and cysteine content is not significant to affect the overall potential renal acid load (PRAL) of the food. In addition to their acid precursor protein content, plants also contain significant amounts of base precursors. Potassium bicarbonate, a basic salt, is produced via the metabolism of other organic potassium salts: citrate, malate, and gluconate, which are substantial in plants. The discrepancy observed in PRAL is accounted for by differences in base precursor content.

== Obesity ==
Obesity affects bone mineral density (BMD) and fracture risk. While increased weight may enhance BMD due to mechanical loading, it can also elevate fracture risk at specific skeletal sites. Studies suggest that obesity impacts bone quality, potentially increasing fragility.

Magnesium is essential for bone health, contributing to bone formation and maintenance. Lower magnesium intake has been linked to reduced BMD, while higher intake may help protect against fractures, particularly in postmenopausal women.

While obesity may increase BMD, body fat distribution and metabolic factors can negatively affect bone quality, potentially raising fracture risk.

== Lifestyle and nutrition ==
Regular physical activity, particularly weight-bearing and resistance exercises, has been shown to improve bone density and reduce the likelihood of fractures. While placing weight-bearing stress on these bones, it will signal the body to start strengthening and it will help stimulate bone growth to make the bones stronger over time.

Adequate intake of calcium and vitamin D is essential for bone health. The National Osteoporosis Foundation recommends a daily calcium intake of 1,000 mg for men aged 50-70 and 1,200 mg for women aged 51 and older and men aged 71 and older. For vitamin D, a daily intake of 800-1,000 IU is recommended for adults aged 50 and older.

== In youth ==
Osteoporosis and compromised bone mineral density (BMD) are significant conditions affecting the youth population. Weight-bearing physical activities are associated with bone development. Several studies have been made regarding different characteristics that affect bone development in youth such as gender, athletic status, type of exercise or sport, and intensity of exercise.

A common way children today receive their daily dose of exercise is within their chosen sport. Sports can vary in their benefit of bone mineral composition and can be sorted into two categories: Osteogenic and Non-Osteogenic. Osteogenic sports are impact sports such as football, baseball, track and field, etc; while non-osteogenic sports are non-impact sports such as swimming or cycling. A study was done examining the relationship between jumping exercise interventions and non-osteogenic sport bone mineral content. The study showed that a 9-month jumping exercise plan can increase the bone mineral content of a non-osteogenic sport participant by 5.6%-12.6%. In conclusion, there is a strong correlation between physical activity and bone health in adolescents and physical activity should be a daily prescription in the lives of our youth today to maintain adequate bone health and development.

== See also ==
- Copper in health
