= Making Mathematics Count =

Report on mathematics education in the UK

Making Mathematics Count is the title of a report on mathematics education in the United Kingdom (U.K.).

The report was written by Adrian Smith as leader of an "Inquiry into Post–14 Mathematics Education", which was commissioned by the UK Government in 2002. The report recommended an increase in mathematics schooling and for statistics to be taught as part of the natural sciences rather than as a part of the mathematics curriculum.

== Inquiry and report ==
Making Mathematics Count is the title of a report on mathematics education in the United Kingdom (U.K.). The report was written by Adrian Smith as leader of an "Inquiry into Post–14 Mathematics Education", which was commissioned by the UK Government in 2002. The purpose of the Inquiry was:

"To make recommendations on changes to the curriculum, qualifications and pedagogy for those aged 14 and over in schools, colleges and higher education institutions to enable those students to acquire the mathematical knowledge and skills necessary to meet the requirements of employers and of further and higher education."

Publication of the report was followed two years later by a conference of 241 delegates, who included mathematics teachers, college lecturers, as well as university mathematicians, head teachers, local authority consultants and advisers, and other mathematics professionals. There is a report of the conclusions of this conference, which was intended to bring together policymakers and practitioners to share information and discuss ways in which changes in mathematics education could be implemented to benefit schools, teachers and students.

== Influence ==
The Smith report has influenced debate on U.K. educational policy. A particular concern of the report was where and how statistics should be taught: the report recommended that statistics should be embedded in application subjects and taught by teachers of those subjects where it is applied. The government decision was that statistics teaching should remain within the mathematics curriculum. A more recent report for the Royal Statistical Society, The Future of Statistics in our Schools and Colleges retains this view.

== Predecessor reports ==
The report's title recalls the Cockcroft report Mathematics Counts which addressed some of the same issues but was compiled 2 decades earlier, instigated by Callaghan and submitted under the Thatcher government.
