= Yaşar Bilgin =

Turkish-German physician and politician

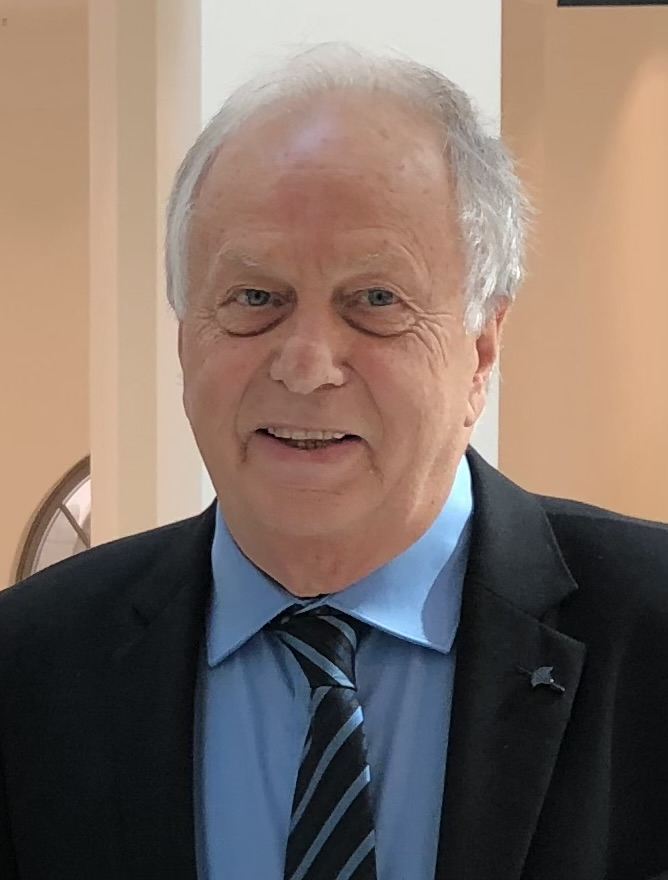
- Bilgin in 2023
- Born: 14 June 1950 (age 75); Mersin, Turkey
- Occupations: Physician and Politician
- Known for: Founder of Turkish-German Health Foundation

Yaşar Bilgin (born 14 June 1950) is a Turkish-born German politician and cardiologist, holding a professorship and a doctorate in this field. He has been a member of the Christian Democratic Union since 2002 and has since been a member of the executive committee of the CDU Hessen. He is also the president of the Turkish-German Health Foundation.

Bilgin was the doctor of prominent figures like Turgut Özal and his wife Semra Özal, Süleyman Demirel, Alparslan Türkeş, Muhsin Yazıcıoğlu and İsmet Sezgin.

== Education and medical career ==
Bilgin studied Medicine both in Turkey and in Germany. Bilgin started his medical studies at the University of Istanbul in 1970 and finished them in 1979 at the Justus Liebig University Giessen, Germany, where he also studied philosophy. From 1986 to 1989 he had stays abroad for scientific work in the field of heart transplantation in Louisville, Kentucky, after which he was recognized as a specialist in internal medicine and cardiology in Giessen. Bilgin has been a professor of cardiology since 1997. Since 1996 Bilgin has been working as a senior physician at the Center for Internal Medicine at Justus Liebig University. Since 2015 he has been the head of the Intercultural Medical Clinic at the Gießen University Hospital.

== Political career ==
Since 1988 he has been chairman of the Turkish-German Health Foundation, the first foundation to look after the interests of Turkish people living in Germany. Since 1992 he has been chairman of the Council of Turkish Citizens with around 2,500 Turkish associations as members in Germany and a member of the Forum Against Racism at the Federal Ministry of the Interior. He is also Member of the German integration summit. Since 2002 Bilgin has been a member of the executive committee of the CDU Hessen and Chairman of the Avicenna-Award-Association.

== Other activities ==
- Chairman of the Council of Turkish Citizens in Germany (since 1994)
- President of the European Turkish Union (2004–2014)
- Member of the integration advisory board of the Hessian state government (since 2010)
- Member of the forum against racism at the Federal Ministry of the Interior (Germany) (since 1998)
- Member of the Scientific Council of the American Heart Association (since 1984)
- Board Member of Hacettepe University (since 2022)
- Board Member of Demiroğlu Bilim University (since 2009)
- Board Member of Istinye University (since 2023)
- Honorary Member of the advisory board of Turkish Citizens Abroad of the Republic of Turkey (since 2010)
- Honorary Chairman of the Solidarity Association for Doctors (TÜRHED) (since 2016)

== Awards ==
- 1993: Honorary Doctorate, Dicle University
- 2001: Honorary doctorate, Zonguldak Bülent Ecevit University
- 2002: Bernhard-Christoph-Faust Award of the Hessian state government
- 2009: High Order of Merit of the Turkish Parliament
- 2010: Hessian Order of Merit
- 2013: Honorary professorship, Bursa Uludağ University
- 2014: Order of Merit of the Federal Republic of Germany
- 2019: Honorary doctorate, İnönü University
