= Jean Innes (scientist) =

British technologist

Jean Elizabeth Innes is a British technologist who was the chief executive officer of the Alan Turing Institute. Her background is in chemistry; today she is an executive for companies and institutes related to data science and artificial intelligence. She previously served as director of strategy at Faculty and in HM Treasury.

== Early life and education ==
Innes studied chemistry at Imperial College London. She moved to the University of Cambridge for her doctoral research and worked as a postdoctoral researcher on a Lindemann Fellowship.

== Research and career ==
Innes joined HM Treasury as a policy researcher. She worked with several ministers and held various roles across the civil service. She joined Rightmove as Director of Consumer Data, where she deployed artificial intelligence at scale and developed relationships with Amazon. Innes joined Faculty, where she was made director of transformation and strategy and acted as an advisor for the World Economic Forum.

In 2023 Innes joined the Alan Turing Institute (ATI) as the chief executive officer. In late 2024, her leadership was criticised by staff who to asked the board to intervene due to a lack confidence in the institute's executive leadership. Furthermore, technology secretary Peter Kyle demanded an overhaul at the Turing Institute, including a change of leadership, in July 2025. A month later it became public that staff had also sent a whistleblowing complaint to the Charity Commission in which they accuse the institute under Innes' leadership "of misusing public funds, overseeing a 'toxic internal culture, and failing to deliver on the charity's mission".

On September 4, 2025 it was announced that Innes will step down as the CEO of the ATI.

Business positions
| Preceded by Adrian Smith (statistician) | CEO of Alan Turing Institute; 2023–2025 | Incumbent |
