= Statistical literacy =

Ability to understand and reason with statistics and data

Statistical literacy is the ability to understand and reason with statistics and data. The abilities to understand and reason with data, or arguments that use data, are necessary for citizens to understand material presented in publications such as newspapers, television, and the Internet. However, scientists also need to develop statistical literacy so that they can both produce rigorous and reproducible research and consume it. Numeracy is an element of being statistically literate and in some models of statistical literacy, or for some populations (e.g., students in kindergarten through 12th grade/end of secondary school), it is a prerequisite skill. Being statistically literate is sometimes taken to include having the abilities to both critically evaluate statistical material and appreciate the relevance of statistically-based approaches to all aspects of life in general or to the evaluating, design, and/or production of scientific work.

== Promoting statistical literacy ==
Each day people are inundated with statistical information from advertisements ("4 out of 5 dentists recommend"), news reports ("opinion poll show the incumbent leading by four points"), and even general conversation ("half the time I don't know what you're talking about"). Experts and advocates often use numerical claims to bolster their arguments, and statistical literacy is a necessary skill to help one decide what experts mean and which advocates to believe. This is important because statistics can be made to produce misrepresentations of data that may seem valid. The aim of statistical literacy proponents is to improve the public understanding of numbers and figures.

Health decisions are often manifest as statistical decision problems but few doctors or patients are well equipped to engage with these data.

Results of opinion polling are often cited by news organizations, but the quality of such polls varies considerably. Some understanding of the statistical technique of sampling is necessary in order to be able to correctly interpret polling results. Sample sizes may be too small to draw meaningful conclusions, and samples may be biased. The wording of a poll question may introduce a bias, and thus can even be used intentionally to produce a biased result. Good polls use unbiased techniques, with much time and effort being spent in the design of the questions and polling strategy. Statistical literacy is necessary to understand what makes a poll trustworthy and to properly weigh the value of poll results and conclusions.

For these reasons, and others, many programs around the world have been created to promote or improve statistical literacy. For example, many official statistical agencies such as Statistics Canada and the Australian Bureau of Statistics have programs to educate students in schools about the nature of statistics. A project of the International Statistical Institute is the only international organization whose focus is to promote national programs and drives to increase the statistical literacy of all members of society. Numerous resources and activities, as well as a body of international experts help maintain a very successful campaign across the continents. The United Nations Economic Commission for Europe has taken the notion of statistical literacy as the subject for its fourth guide to making data meaningful. Recognising the obligation of its royal charter to promote the public understanding of statistics, in 2010 the Royal Statistical Society launched a ten-year statistical literacy campaign.

== Models of statistical literacy ==
Experiments in the sciences, business models and reports, use statistics. People involved in these fields generally have studied the meaning of statistical quantities, such as averages and standard deviation. Many colleges and universities require an introductory course in statistics as part of a professional program.

Data visualization can contribute to either understanding or misunderstanding of the data or of the argument being made with the data.

Studies have shown that human beings’ estimations of probabilities are heavily influenced by context and wording. Statistical reasoning may be difficult to develop and refine, which has led to labeling this type of reasoning as not intuitive. For example, people typically underestimate the probability of being involved in a car accident because their everyday interaction with vehicles gives the impression that they are safer than they actually are. Likewise, they tend to overestimate the probability of being attacked by a shark because of media or other influences.

Gambling is one setting in which a lack of statistical literacy can be costly. Simple probability theory helps the individual either estimate or calculate the probabilities involved with games of chance. However, most individuals fail to approximate, for example, the probability of being dealt a full-house in a game of poker. Not understanding these probabilities causes the individual to wager more or less than they would knowing at least an estimate of the probability. Increasing individuals’ statistical literacy and knowledge of probability through classroom applications, textbook examples, and other methods, would lead to more informed citizens, capable of making more informed decisions, or perhaps not.

The definition of statistical literacy and opinions about it have been somewhat historically variable. Before 1940 some statistical skills passed to the sciences. Some statistics was then taught in grade school, "So a degree of statistical literacy will be universal in the future...". More recently, expectations have been higher. "'Statistical Literacy' is the ability to understand and critically evaluate statistical results that permeate our lives...". Those statistical results often originate from inferential methods which reached college statistics textbooks in about 1940. Statistics continues to advance. A lack of statistical literacy has long been condemned under many labels. H.G. Wells has been cited as saying that statistical understanding will one day be as important as being able to read or write but he may have been referring more to the older idea of political arithmetic than modern statistics.

== Books ==
Textbooks used in teaching statistical literacy:

- Concepts and Controversies by David Moore and William Notz.
- Seeing Through Statistics by Jessica Utts.
- Statistical Reasoning for Everyday Life by Jeff Bennett, William Briggs and Marlo Triola.
- Statistical Literacy: Critical Thinking about Everyday Statistics by Milo Schield.

Evaluating statistical claims (popular books):

- How To Lie with Statistics (1954) by Darrell Huff.
- Damned Lies and Statistics (2001) by Joel Best.
- Calling Bullshit (2021) by Carl Bergstrom and Jevon West.

== Early research articles and books (1993-2011) ==
- Wallman, K. K. (1993). Enhancing statistical literacy: Enriching our society. Journal of the American Statistical Association, 88(421), 1.
- Schield, M. (1999). Statistical literacy: Thinking critically about statistics. Of Significance 1.1. P 15-21.
- Ben-Zvi, D. & J. Garfield (1999). Statistical Literacy, Reasoning, and Thinking: Goals, Definitions, and Challenges in Challenge of Developing Statistical Literacy, Reasoning and Thinking. p. 3-15. Springer, Dordrecht.
- delMas, R. C. (2002). Statistical Literacy, Reasoning, and Thinking: A Commentary. Journal of Statistics Education, 10(2).
- Gal, I. (2002). Adults' Statistical literacy: Meanings, Components, Responsibilities. International Statistical Review, 2002, 70(1), 1-25.
- Watson, J. M. & Callingham, R. (2003). Statistical literacy: A complex hierarchical construct. Statistics Education Research Journal, 2(2), 3–46.
- Schield, M. (2004). Information Literacy, Statistical Literacy and Data Literacy. 2004 IASSIST IQ Journal, Vol. 28.
- Watson, J. M. (2006). Statistical literacy at school: Growth and goals. Mahwah, NJ: Lawrence Erlbaum.
- Ridgway, J., Nicholson, J., & McCusker, S. (2011). Developing statistical literacy in students and teachers. In C. Batanero, G. Burrill, & C. Reading (Eds.), Teaching statistics in school mathematics-challenges for teaching and teacher education: A joint ICMI/IASE study (pp. 311–322). Dordrecht: Springer.

== See also ==
- Misuse of statistics
- Lies, damned lies, and statistics
- Statistics education
- How to Lie with Statistics
- Data literacy
