= Gail F. Burrill =

American mathematician

- Occupation: Mathematics educator
- Employer: Michigan State University
- Known for: Honorary doctorate by the Rose-Hulman Institute of Technology (2000); President of the National Council of Teachers of Mathematics
- Awards: Presidential Award for Excellence in Teaching Mathematics (1985)

Gail F. Burrill is a mathematics educator who was president of the National Council of Teachers of Mathematics (NCTM) from 1996 to 1998. She works as a specialist in the Program in Mathematics Education at Michigan State University.

Burrill worked for nearly 30 years as a high school mathematics teacher; she is also the author of multiple textbooks, and has pushed to include statistics in the curriculum.

She won the Presidential Award for Excellence in Teaching Mathematics in 1985, and the lifetime achievement award of the NCTM in 2012. She was also given an honorary doctorate by the Rose-Hulman Institute of Technology in 2000. In 1994, she was elected as a fellow of the American Statistical Association.
