= Potential renal acid load =

Potential renal acid load (PRAL) is a measure of the acid that the body produces after ingesting a food. This is different from pH, which is the acidity of a food before being consumed. PRAL is a different acidity measure than the food ash measurement.

Some acidic foods actually have a negative PRAL measurement, meaning they reduce acidity in the stomach.

A low PRAL diet (not to be confused with an alkaline diet) can lower acidity in the stomach, which can be helpful for people suffering GERD or Acid Reflux. However, it does not lower the pH of blood and therefore cannot treat osteoporosis or other conditions.

== See also ==
- Net acid excretion
