= Statistics education =

Practice of teaching statistics

Statistics education is the practice of teaching and learning of statistics, along with the associated scholarly research.

Statistics is both a formal science and a practical theory of scientific inquiry, and both aspects are considered in statistics education. Education in statistics has similar concerns as does education in other mathematical sciences, like logic, mathematics, and computer science. At the same time, statistics is concerned with evidence-based reasoning, particularly with the analysis of data. Therefore, education in statistics has strong similarities to education in empirical disciplines like psychology and chemistry, in which education is closely tied to "hands-on" experimentation.

Mathematicians and statisticians often work in a department of mathematical sciences (particularly at colleges and small universities). Statistics courses have been sometimes taught by non-statisticians, against the recommendations of some professional organizations of statisticians and of mathematicians.

Statistics education research is an emerging field that grew out of different disciplines and is currently establishing itself as a unique field that is devoted to the improvement of teaching and learning statistics at all educational levels.

== Goals of statistics education ==
Statistics educators have cognitive and noncognitive goals for students. For example, former American Statistical Association (ASA) President Katherine Wallman defined statistical literacy as including the cognitive abilities of understanding and critically evaluating statistical results as well as appreciating the contributions statistical thinking can make.

=== Cognitive goals ===
In the text rising from the 2008 joint conference of the International Commission on Mathematical Instruction and the International Association of Statistics Educators, editors Carmen Batanero, Gail Burrill, and Chris Reading (Universidad de Granada, Spain, Michigan State University, USA, and University of New England, Australia, respectively) note worldwide trends in curricula which reflect data-oriented goals. In particular, educators currently seek to have students: "design investigations; formulate research questions; collect data using observations, surveys, and experiments; describe and compare data sets; and propose and justify conclusions and predictions based on data." The authors note the importance of developing statistical thinking and reasoning in addition to statistical knowledge.

Despite the fact that cognitive goals for statistics education increasingly focus on statistical literacy, statistical reasoning, and statistical thinking rather than on skills, computations and procedures alone, there is no agreement about what these terms mean or how to assess these outcomes. A first attempt to define and distinguish between these three terms appears in the ARTIST website which was created by Garfield, delMas and Chance and has since been included in several publications. Brief definitions of these terms are as follows:

1. Statistical literacy is being able to read and use basic statistical language and graphical representations to understand statistical information in the media and in daily life.
2. Statistical reasoning is being able to reason about and connect different statistical concepts and ideas, such as knowing how and why outliers affect statistical measures of center and variability.
3. Statistical thinking is the type of thinking used by statisticians when they encounter a statistical problem. This involves thinking about the nature and quality of the data and, where the data came from, choosing appropriate analyses and models, and interpreting the results in the context of the problem and given the constraints of the data.

Further cognitive goals of statistics education vary across students' educational level and the contexts in which they expect to encounter statistics.

Statisticians have proposed what they consider the most important statistical concepts for educated citizens. For example, Utts (2003) published seven areas of what every educated citizen should know, including understanding that "variability is normal" and how "coincidences… are not uncommon because there are so many possibilities." Gal (2002) suggests adults in industrialized societies are expected to exercise statistical literacy, "the ability to interpret and critically evaluate statistical information… in diverse contexts, and the ability to… communicate understandings and concerns regarding the… conclusions."

=== Non-cognitive goals ===
Non-cognitive outcomes include affective constructs such as attitudes, beliefs, emotions, dispositions, and motivation. According to prominent researchers Gal & Ginsburg, statistics educators should make it a priority to be aware of students' ideas, reactions, and feelings towards statistics and how these affect their learning.

==== Beliefs ====
Beliefs are defined as one's individually held ideas about statistics, about oneself as a learner of statistics, and about the social context of learning statistics. Beliefs are distinct from attitudes in the sense that attitudes are relatively stable and intense feelings that develop over time in the context of experiences learning statistics. Students' web of beliefs provides a context for their approach towards their classroom experiences in statistics. Many students enter a statistics course with apprehension towards learning the subject, which works against the learning environment that the instructor is trying to accomplish. Therefore, it is important for instructors to have access to assessment instruments that can give an initial diagnosis of student beliefs and monitor beliefs during a course. Frequently, assessment instruments have monitored beliefs and attitudes together. For examples of such instruments, see the attitudes section below.

==== Dispositions ====
Disposition has to do with the ways students question the data and approach a statistical problem. Dispositions is one of the four dimensions in Wild and Pfannkuch's framework for statistical thinking, and contains the following elements:

- Curiosity and Awareness: These traits are a part of the process of generating questions and generating ideas to explore and analyze data.
- Engagement: Students will be most observant and aware in the areas they find most interesting.
- Imagination: This trait is important for viewing a problem from different perspectives and coming up with possible explanations.
- Scepticism: Critical thinking is important for receiving new ideas and information and evaluating the appropriateness of study design and analysis.
- Being logical: The ability to detect when one idea follows from another is important for arriving at valid conclusions.
- A propensity to seek deeper meaning: This means not taking everything at face value and being open to consider new ideas and dig deeper for information.

Scheaffer states that a goal of statistics education is to have students see statistics broadly. He developed a list of views of statistics that can lead to this broad view, and describes them as follows:

- Statistics as number sense: Do I understand what the numbers mean? (seeing data as numbers in context, reading charts, graphs and tables, understanding numerical and graphical summaries of data, etc.)
- Statistics as a way of understanding the world: Can I use existing data to help make decisions? (using census data, birth and death rates, disease rates, CPI, ratings, rankings, etc., to describe, decide and defend)
- Statistics as organized problem solving: Can I design and carry out a study to answer specific questions? (pose problem, collect data according to a plan, analyze data, and draw conclusions from data)

==== Attitudes ====
Since students often experience math anxiety and negative opinions about statistics courses, various researchers have addressed attitudes and anxiety towards statistics. Some instruments have been developed to measure college students' attitudes towards statistics, and have been shown to have appropriate psychometric properties. Examples of such instruments include:

- Survey of Attitudes Towards Statistics (SATS), developed by Schau, Stevens, Dauphinee, and Del Vecchio
- Attitude Toward Statistics Scale, developed by Wise
- Statistics Attitude Survey (SAS), developed by Roberts and Bilderback

Careful use of instruments such as these can help statistics instructors to learn about students' perception of statistics, including their anxiety towards learning statistics, the perceived difficulty of learning statistics, and their perceived usefulness of the subject. Some studies have shown modest success at improving student attitudes in individual courses, but no generalizable studies showing improvement in student attitudes have been seen.

Nevertheless, one of the goals of statistics education is to make the study of statistics a positive experience for students and to bring in interesting and engaging examples and data that will motivate students. According to a fairly recent literature review, improved student attitudes towards statistics can lead to better motivation and engagement, which also improves cognitive learning outcomes.

== Primary–secondary education level ==
=== New Zealand ===
In New Zealand, a new curriculum for statistics has been developed by Chris Wild and colleagues at Auckland University. Rejecting the contrived, and now unnecessary due to computer power, approach of reasoning under the null and the restrictions of normal theory, they use comparative box plots and bootstrap to introduce concepts of sampling variability and inference. The developing curriculum also contains aspects of statistical literacy.

=== United Kingdom ===
In the United Kingdom, at least some statistics has been taught in schools since the 1930s. At present, A-level qualifications (typically taken by 17- to 18-year-olds) are being developed in "Statistics" and "Further Statistics". The coverage of the former includes: Probability; Data Collection; Descriptive Statistics; Discrete Probability Distributions; Binomial Distribution; Poisson Distributions; Continuous Probability Distributions; The Normal Distribution; Estimation; Hypothesis Testing; Chi-Squared; Correlation and Regression. The coverage of "Further Statistics" includes: Continuous Probability Distributions; Estimation; Hypothesis Testing; One Sample Tests; Hypothesis Testing; Two Sample Tests; Goodness of Fit Tests; Experimental Design; Analysis of Variance (Anova); Statistical Process Control; Acceptance Sampling. The Centre for Innovation in Mathematics Teaching (CIMT) has online course notes for these sets of topics. Revision notes for an existing qualification indicate a similar coverage. At an earlier age (typically 15–16 years) GCSE qualifications in mathematics contain "Statistics and Probability" topics on: Probability; Averages; Standard Deviation; Sampling; Cumumulative Frequency Graphs (including median and quantiles); Representing Data; Histograms. The UK's Office for National Statistics has a webpage leading to material suitable for both teachers and students at school level. In 2004 the Smith inquiry made the following statement:

"There is much concern and debate about the positioning of Statistics and Data Handling within the current mathematics GCSE, where it occupies some 25 per cent of the timetable allocation. On the one hand, there is widespread agreement that the Key Stage 4 curriculum is over-crowded and that the introduction of Statistics and Data Handling may have been at the expense of time needed for practising and acquiring fluency in core mathematical manipulations. Many in higher education mathematics and engineering departments take this view. On the other hand, there is overwhelming recognition, shared by the Inquiry, of the vital importance of Statistics and Data Handling skills both for a number of other academic disciplines and in the workplace. The Inquiry recommends that there be a radical re-look at this issue and that much of the teaching and learning of Statistics and Data Handling would be better removed from the mathematics timetable and integrated with the teaching and learning of other disciplines (e.g. biology or geography). The time restored to the mathematics timetable should be used for acquiring greater mastery of core mathematical concepts and operations."

=== United States ===
In the United States, schooling has increased the use of probability and statistics, especially since the 1990s. Summary statistics and graphs are taught in elementary school in many states. Topics in probability and statistical reasoning are taught in high school algebra (or mathematical science) courses; statistical reasoning has been examined in the SAT test since 1994. The College Board has developed an Advanced Placement course in statistics, which has provided a college-level course in statistics to hundreds of thousands of high school students, with the first examination happening in May 1997. In 2007, the ASA endorsed the Guidelines for Assessment and Instruction in Statistics Education (GAISE), a two-dimensional framework for the conceptual understanding of statistics in Pre-K-12 students. The framework contains learning objectives for students at each conceptual level and provides pedagogical examples that are consistent with the conceptual levels.

=== Estonia ===
Estonia is piloting a new statistics curriculum developed by the Computer-Based Math foundation based around its principles of using computers as the primary tool of education. in cooperation with the University of Tartu.

== University level ==
=== General ===
Statistics is often taught in departments of mathematics or in departments of mathematical sciences. At the undergraduate level, statistics is often taught as a service course.

==== United Kingdom ====
By tradition in the U.K., most professional statisticians are trained at the Master level. A difficulty of recruiting strong undergraduates has been noted: "Very few undergraduates positively choose to study statistics degrees; most choose some statistics options within a mathematics programme, often to avoid the advanced pure and applied mathematics courses. My view is that statistics as a theoretical discipline is better taught late rather than early, whereas statistics as part of scientific methodology should be taught as part of science."

In the United Kingdom, the teaching of statistics at university level was originally done within science departments that needed the topic to accompany the teaching of their own subjects, and departments of mathematics had limited coverage before the 1930s. For the twenty years subsequent to this, while departments of mathematics had started to teach statistics, there was little realisation that essentially the same basic statistical methodology was being applied across a variety of sciences. Statistical departments have had difficulty when they have been separated from mathematics departments.

Psychologist Andy Field (British Psychological Society Teaching and Book Award) created a new concept of statistical teaching and textbooks that goes beyond the printed page.

==== United States ====
Enrollments in statistics have increased in community colleges, in four-year colleges and universities in the United States. At community colleges in the United States, mathematics has experienced increased enrollment since 1990. At community colleges, the ratio of the students enrolled in statistics to those enrolled in calculus rose from 56% in 1990 to 82% in 1995. One of the ASA-endorsed GAISE reports focused on statistics education at the introductory college level. The report includes a brief history of the introductory statistics course and recommendations for how it should be taught.

In many colleges, a basic course in "statistics for non-statisticians" has required only elementary algebra (and not calculus) as a prerequisite and many modern introductory texts emphasize the use of technology, such as graphing calculators, spreadsheets, programming languages such as Python or R, and dedicated statistical software, over manual pencil and paper calculations; for future statisticians, in contrast, the undergraduate exposure to statistics is highly mathematical. (Note: "Undergraduate major programs should include study of probability and statistical theory, along with the prerequisite mathematics, especially calculus and linear algebra. Programs for nonmajors may require less study of mathematics. Programs preparing for graduate work may require additional mathematics." American Statistical Association. "Curriculum Guidelines for Undergraduate Programs in Statistical Science".) As undergraduates, future statisticians should have completed courses in multivariate calculus, linear algebra, computer programming, and a year of calculus-based probability and statistics. Students wanting to obtain a doctorate in statistics from "any of the better graduate programs in statistics" should also take "real analysis". Laboratory courses in physics, chemistry and psychology also provide useful experiences with planning and conducting experiments and with analyzing data. The ASA recommends that undergraduate students consider obtaining a bachelor's degree in applied mathematics as preparation for entering a master program in statistics. (Note: The ASA makes the following recommendations for undergraduates wishing to become statisticians: "Major in applied mathematics, or a closely related field. If you do major in a nonstatistical field, minor in mathematics or statistics. Develop a background in mathematics, science, and computers and gain knowledge in a specific field of interest. A master's degree or PhD is very helpful and often recommended or required for higher-level positions." American Statistical Association. "How Do I Become a Statistician?".)

Historically, professional degrees in statistics have been at the Master level, although some students may qualify to work with a bachelor's degree and job-related experience or further self-study. (Note: "A master's degree or PhD is very helpful and often recommended or required for higher-level positions." American Statistical Association. "How Do I Become a Statistician?".) Professional competence requires a background in mathematics—including at least multivariate calculus, linear algebra, and a year of calculus-based probability and statistics. In the United States, a master program in statistics requires courses in probability, mathematical statistics, and applied statistics (e.g., design of experiments, survey sampling, etc.).

For a doctoral degree in statistics, it has been traditional that students complete a course in measure-theoretic probability as well as courses in mathematical statistics. Such courses require a good course in real analysis, covering the proofs of the theory of calculus and topics like the uniform convergence of functions. In recent decades, some departments have discussed allowing doctoral students to waive the course in measure-theoretic probability by demonstrating advanced skills in computer programming or scientific computing. (Note: Stanford University statistician Persi Diaconis wrote that "I see a strong trend against measure theory in modern statistics departments: I had to fight to keep the measure theory requirement in Stanford's statistics graduate program. The fight was lost at Berkeley." Diaconis, Persi (March 2004). "A Frequentist does this, a Bayesian that (Review of Probability Theory: The Logic of Science by E.T. Jaynes)". SIAM News. Archived from the original on 7 October 2007.)

== Who should teach statistics? ==
The question of what qualities are needed to teach statistics has been much discussed, and sometimes this discussion is concentrated on the qualifications necessary for those undertaking such teaching. The question arises separately for teaching at both school and university levels, partly because of the need for numerically more such teachers at school level and partly because of need for such teachers to cover a broad range of other topics within their overall duties. Given that "statistics" is often taught to non-scientists, opinions can range all the way from "statistics should be taught by statisticians", through "teaching of statistics is too mathematical" to the extreme that "statistics should not be taught by statisticians".

=== Teaching at university level ===
In the United States especially, statisticians have long complained that many mathematics departments have assigned mathematicians (without statistical competence) to teach statistics courses, effectively giving "double blind" courses. The principle that college-instructors should have qualifications and engagement with their academic discipline has long been violated in United States colleges and universities, according to generations of statisticians. For example, the journal Statistical Science reprinted "classic" articles on the teaching of statistics by non-statisticians by Harold Hotelling; Hotelling's articles are followed by the comments of Kenneth J. Arrow, W. Edwards Deming, Ingram Olkin, David S. Moore, James V. Sidek, Shanti S. Gupta, Robert V. Hogg, Ralph A. Bradley, and by Harold Hotelling Jr. (an economist and son of Harold Hotelling).

Data on the teaching of statistics in the United States has been collected on behalf of the Conference Board of the Mathematical Sciences (CBMS). Examining data from 2000, Schaeffer and Stasny reported

By far the majority of instructors within statistics departments have at least a master’s degree in statistics or biostatistics (about 89% for doctoral departments and about 79% for master’s departments). In doctoral mathematics departments, however, only about 58% of statistics course instructors had at least a master’s degree in statistics or biostatistics as their highest degree earned. In master’s-level mathematics departments, the corresponding percentage was near 44%, and in bachelor’s-level departments only 19% of statistics course instructors had at least a master’s degree in statistics or biostatistics as their highest degree earned. As we expected, a large majority of instructors in statistics departments (83% for doctoral departments and 62% for master’s departments) held doctoral degrees in either statistics or biostatistics. The comparable percentages for instructors of statistics in mathematics departments were about 52% and 38%.

The principle that statistics-instructors should have statistical competence has been affirmed by the guidelines of the Mathematical Association of America, which has been endorsed by the ASA. The unprofessional teaching of statistics by mathematicians (without qualifications in statistics) has been addressed in many articles.

== Teaching methods ==
The literature on methods of teaching statistics is closely related to the literature on the teaching of mathematics for two reasons. First, statistics is often taught as part of the mathematics curriculum, by instructors trained in mathematics and working in a mathematics department. Second, statistical theory has often been taught as a mathematical theory rather than as the practical logic of science --- as the science that "puts chance to work" in Rao's phrase--- and this has entailed an emphasis on formal and manipulative training, such as solving combinatorial problems involving red and green jelly beans. Statisticians have complained that mathematicians are prone to overemphasize mathematical manipulations and probability theory and under-emphasize questions of experimentation, survey methodology, exploratory data analysis, and statistical inference.

In recent decades, there has been an increased emphasis on data analysis and scientific inquiry in statistics education. In the United Kingdom, the Smith inquiry Making Mathematics Count suggests teaching basic statistical concepts as part of the science curriculum, rather than as part of mathematics. In the United States, the ASA's guidelines for undergraduate statistics specify that introductory statistics should emphasize the scientific methods of data collection, particularly randomized experiments and random samples: further, the first course should review these topics when the theory of "statistical inference" is studied. Similar recommendations occur for the Advanced Placement (AP) course in Statistics. The ASA and AP guidelines are followed by contemporary textbooks in the US, such as those by Freedman, Purvis & Pisani (Statistics) and by David S. Moore (Introduction to the Practice of Statistics with McCabe and Statistics: Concepts and Controversies with Notz) and by Watkins, Schaeffer & Cobb (Statistics: From Data to Decisions and Statistics in Action).

Besides an emphasis on the scientific inquiry in the content of beginning of statistics, there has also been an increase on active learning in the conduct of the statistics classroom.

== Professional community ==
=== Associations ===
The International Statistical Institute (ISI) now has one section devoted to education, the International Association for Statistical Education (IASE), which runs the International Conference on Teaching Statistics every four years as well as IASE satellite conferences around ISI and ICMI meetings. The UK established the Royal Statistical Society Centre for Statistics Education and the ASA now also has a Section on Statistical Education, focused mostly on statistics teaching at the elementary and secondary levels.

=== Conferences ===
In addition to the international gatherings of statistics educators at ICOTS every four years, the US hosts a US Conference on Teaching Statistics (USCOTS) every two years and has recently started an Electronic Conference on Teaching Statistics (eCOTS) to alternate with USCOTS. Sessions on statistics education area also offered at many conferences in mathematics educations such as the International Congress on Mathematical Education, the National Council of Teachers of Mathematics, the Conference of the International Group for the Psychology of Mathematics Education, and the Mathematics Education Research Group of Australasia. The annual Joint Statistical Meetings (offered by the ASA and Statistics Canada) offer many sessions and roundtables on statistics education. The International Research Forums on Statistical Reasoning, Thinking, and Literacy offer scientific gatherings every two years and related publications in journals, CD-ROMs and books on research in statistics education.

=== Graduate coursework and programs ===
Only three universities currently offer graduate programs in statistics education: the University of Granada, the University of Minnesota, and the University of Florida. However, graduate students in a variety of disciplines (e.g., mathematics education, psychology, educational psychology) have been finding ways to complete dissertations on topics related to teaching and learning statistics. These dissertations are archived on the IASE web site.

Two main courses in statistics education that have been taught in a variety of settings and departments are a course on teaching statistics and a course on statistics education research. An ASA-sponsored workshop has established recommendations for additional graduate programs and courses.

== Software for learning ==
- Fathom: Dynamic Data Software
- TinkerPlots
- StatCrunch

== Trends in statistics education ==
Teachers of statistics have been encouraged to explore new directions in curriculum content, pedagogy and assessment. In an influential talk at USCOTS, researcher George Cobb presented an innovative approach to teaching statistics that put simulation, randomization, and bootstrapping techniques at the core of the college-level introductory course, in place of traditional content such as probability theory and the t-test. Several teachers and curriculum developers have been exploring ways to introduce simulation, randomization, and bootstrapping as teaching tools for the secondary and postsecondary levels. Courses such as the University of Minnesota's CATALST, Nathan Tintle and collaborators' Introduction to Statistical Investigations, and the Lock team's Unlocking the Power of Data, are curriculum projects based on Cobb's ideas. Other researchers have been exploring the development of informal inferential reasoning as a way to use these methods to build a better understanding of statistical inference.

Another recent direction is addressing the big data sets that are increasingly affecting or being contributed to in our daily lives. Statistician Rob Gould, creator of Data Cycle, The Musical dinner and theatre spectacular, outlines many of these types of data and encourages teachers to find ways to use the data and address issues around big data. According to Gould, curricula focused on big data will address issues of sampling, prediction, visualization, data cleaning, and the underlying processes that generate data, rather than traditionally emphasized methods of making statistical inferences such as hypothesis testing.

Driving both of these changes is the increased role of computing in teaching and learning statistics. Some researchers argue that as the use of modeling and simulation increase, and as data sets become larger and more complex, students will need better and more technical computing skills. Projects such as MOSAIC have been creating courses that blend computer science, modeling, and statistics.

== See also ==
- Statistical literacy
- Mathematics education
- Science education
- Recreational mathematics
