= Lifespan timeline of Kings of Romania =

This is a graphical lifespan timeline of Kings of Romania. The kings are listed in order of office.
