= Irving Geis =

American artist

- Born: October 18, 1908; New York City
- Died: July 22, 1997 (aged 88)
- Education: Georgia Institute of Technology; University of Pennsylvania; University of South Carolina
- Known for: Scientific illustration

Irving Geis (October 18, 1908 – July 22, 1997) was an American artist who worked closely with biologists. Geis's hand-drawn work depicts many structures of biological macromolecules, such as DNA and proteins, including the first crystal structure of sperm whale myoglobin.

== Early life and education ==
Geis was born in New York City, and lived in Anderson, South Carolina for a time. He studied architecture at Georgia Tech from 1925 to 1927, and went on to get a Bachelor of Fine Arts at the University of Pennsylvania in 1929. From there he attended the University of South Carolina from 1932 to 1933, graduating with a degree in design and painting in the midst of the Great Depression.

== Career ==
Geis served as a coauthor and illustrator of many biochemical books that were written by Albert Lehninger and Richard E. Dickerson, as well as the book How to Lie with Statistics by Darrell Huff. He was a frequent contributor to Scientific American. In addition to his technical illustrations, Geis created the prototype Charley McCarthy puppet for puppeteer Edgar Bergen.
