= Tony Greenfield =

British statistical consultant and academic (1931–2019)

Personal details
- Born: 26 April 1931 Chapeltown, South Yorkshire
- Died: 19 March 2019 (aged 87) Sheffield, South Yorkshire
- Party: Labour Party (UK)
- Spouse: Elizabeth Mary Greenfield
- Education: Bedford School
- Occupation: Industrial Research Consultant

Tony Greenfield (26 April 1931 – 19 March 2019) was a British statistical consultant and academic. He was formerly Head of Process Computing and Statistics at the British Iron and Steel Research Association, Sheffield, and Professor of Medical Computing and Statistics at Queen's University, Belfast.

Until he retired, at the age of 80, he was a visiting professor to the Industrial Statistics Research Unit of the University of Newcastle-upon-Tyne and to the Universitat Politècnica de Catalunya.

Greenfield co-authored Design and Analyse your Experiments with Minitab with Andrew Metcalfe and Engineering Statistics with Matlab. His inaugural lecture (1980) at Queen's University is still sold as a booklet. His first book, Research Methods for Postgraduates is highly regarded on both sides of the Atlantic and is now in its third edition, published by Wiley. He has also had a strong hand in The Pocket Statistician, Statistical Practice in Business and Industry and an Encyclopaedia of Statistics in Quality and Reliability. One of his contributions to his local community of Great Hucklow is the editing of a history of lead mining in the area: Lead in the Veins.

Tony was a founding member and Past President of European Network for Business and Industrial Statistics and for many years he was a prominent member of the Royal Statistical Society. He was the first editor of RSS News and of the ENBIS newsletter and magazine. In its first ten years, ENBIS grew to a membership base of around 1500 practitioners spread across more than sixty countries.

Tony was a Chartered Statistician (CStat) and a Chartered Scientist (CSci).

== Early life ==
Tony Greenfield was born in Chapeltown, South Yorkshire on 26 April 1931 to Geoffrey James Greenfield (1900–1978) and Hilda Aynsley (1903–1976).

Tony Greenfield worked in an iron mine when he left Bedford School at the age of 17. He later worked in coal mines, a brass tube factory, and in a copper mine and studied mining engineering at Imperial College London. He received the diploma in journalism from the Regent Street Polytechnic, worked on the Sunday Express and Sunday Mirror before turning to technical journalism for ten years. He was an active member of the Sheffield Junior Chamber of Commerce of which he was chairman of the Business Affairs committee and editor of The Hub, the chamber's monthly magazine. At the 1963 conference in Tel Aviv of Junior Chamber International he was acknowledged as the editor of the best junior chamber magazine in the world.

He moved into the steel industry to write technical reports for Operations Research (OR) scientists. There he found satisfaction in solving production problems, studied OR, mathematics, statistics and computing leading to an external degree from University College London. He moved into steel research and became head of process computing and statistics. Much of his work was in design and analysis of experiments for which he received his PhD. When the laboratories closed he joined the medical faculty of University of Sheffield where he was statistician to a multi-centre study of cot death. He taught medical statistics to undergraduates, supported post graduates and medical staff with consultancy and co-authored one of the first interactive statistics packages to be written on Prime computers.

== Career ==
Tony moved to Belfast as professor of medical computing and statistics at Queen's University. Early retirement enabled him to work as a research consultant.

Greenfield's passion was to persuade all scientists and engineers to write, speak and present their work in language that other people understand well enough to use in some ways. And, like W B Yeats, he asks scientists to "think like a wise man but communicate in the language of the people." Like Isaac Asimov, he was "on fire to explain," and didn't "indulge in scholarly depth."

He believed strongly that the economic fortune of Europe depends on the success in the world markets of our manufacturing industries.

"Statisticians and statistical practitioners across Europe know that statistical methods have improved business and industrial performance and can continue do so in the future," he says. "Our national quality of life will be improved and secured if we can communicate the philosophy, as well as the methods, of statistics to engineers and others in the manufacturing and the service industries.

"Businessmen and engineers need to understand the benefits of applied probability and statistics; they need to understand how the methods are applied to their own work; they need to be fully converted to a frame of mind that will make them automatically question sources of variability in everything that they do and, without outside prompting, adopt the statistical approach.

He and others founded ENBIS to stimulate the application of statistical methods to economic and technical development and to business and industry across the whole of Europe. They have created a networking forum for the exchange of ideas between statistical practitioners. He has spread this passion by speaking in many cities across Europe from Tel Aviv, through Turin, Budapest, Ljubljana, Copenhagen, Brussels and London.

== Awards ==
- Chambers Medal for outstanding services to the RSS.
- George Box Medal by ENBIS for Outstanding Contributions to Industrial Statistics.
- William G Hunter Award by the American Society for Quality for the creative development and application of statistical techniques to problem-solving in the quality field.
- The Royal Statistical Society awards the Greenfield Industrial Medal for contributions to the effective application of statistical methods to the manufacturing and allied industries.

== Personal life ==
Tony was a member of the Longstone Local History Society, the Bakewell Photographic Circle, Writers in the Peak, the Hucklows Community Spirit, and the Parisot (Tarn-et-Garonne)/Hucklows Twinning Committee.

As for politics, Tony was sent to a public school at the age of 13 and was alienated by the right-wing attitudes of the staff and boys. This made him a radical for life. He joined the Liberal Party, eventually becoming a Prospective Parliamentary Candidate (PPC) for Sheffield Hallam, but was faced with ideas with which he didn't agree so he joined the Labour Party (UK) and was active for more than 20 years in the High Peak constituency.

Greenfield died on 19 March 2019 at the age of 87.

== Books ==
Research Methods for Postgraduates, 3rd Edition (ISBN 978-1-118-76299-8) by Tony Greenfield (Editor), Sue Greener (Editor)

Statistical Practice in Business and Industry (ISBN 978-0-470-01497-4) by Shirley Coleman (Editor), Tony Greenfield (Co-Editor), Dave Stewardson (Co-Editor), Douglas C. Montgomery (Co-Editor)

Design and Analyse Your Experiment Using Minitab (ISBN 978-0-340-80780-4) by Tony Greenfield, Andrew V. Metcalfe

== Presented papers (a selection) ==
Computational techniques as an aid in physical metallurgy

ISI conference, Leeds 1971

A statistical approach to oxygen steelmaking

International Steelmakers' Conference, Amsterdam, 1973

Discriminant analysis as a diagnostic aid

IEEE conference on 'Computers for analysis and control in medical and biological research' 1974

Iterative and sequential methods for sine wave fitting

Colloquium on 'Methods of study of biological rhythms', Manchester 1975

Training statistical consultants for the pharmaceutical industry

Seminar of 'Statisticians in the Pharmaceutical Industry' 1979

Reproducibility in histopathology

Conference on 'statistics in medicine', Sheffield 1980

Simulation is a tool for improving NHS procedures

CQI and the NHS, BMA, October 1997

== Published papers (a selection) ==
Technology to Pay for Tomorrow

New Scientist, August 1970

Discriminant value of thyroid function tests (with Barnett, Howlett, Hudson and Smith)

British Medical Journal, April 1973

Metabolic profile study of patients receiving lithium carbonate (with Birch)

British Journal of Pharmacology 1974

Lithium therapy and alkaline earth metal metabolism (with Birch)

Psychological Medicine 1977

British Steel's Research Strategy

The Times, 16 January 1978

Computers and Health

Inaugural lecture, Queen's University, Belfast, 1980

The Road to Better Diagnosis

Proceedings of the Hospital Physicists Association and Biological Engineering Society, 1981

Laboratory data on ICU admissions (with Batchelor)

Anaesthesia, 1982

Introducing computers studies to an established medical curriculum

In 'Meeting the Challenge: Informatics and Medical Education’ – North Holland 1983

The Medical Effects of the Seat Belt Legislation in the United Kingdom (with Rutherford)

DHSS report 1985

Biometric Review and Advice to the Government of Bolivia

ODA report 1988

Communicating Statistics

JRSS (A) 1993 part 2

Femoral neck and total body bone mineral density predict incident non-spine fractures (with Greenfield DM and Eastell R)

American Society for Bone and Mineral Research, Cincinnati, September 1997

Simulation of clinical trials

Clinical Research Manual Supplement 24 (2007), published by Euromed Communications

== See also ==
George E. P. Box
William G Hunter
