= Statcheck =

Software tool designed to detect statistical reporting errors

Statcheck is an R package designed to detect statistical errors in peer-reviewed psychology articles by searching papers for statistical results, redoing the calculations described in each paper, and comparing the two values to see if they match. It takes advantage of the fact that psychological research papers tend to report their results in accordance with the guidelines published by the American Psychological Association (APA). This leads to several disadvantages: it can only detect results reported completely and in exact accordance with the APA's guidelines, and it cannot detect statistics that are only included in tables in the paper. Another limitation is that Statcheck cannot deal with statistical corrections to test statistics, like Greenhouse–Geisser or Bonferroni corrections, which actually make tests more conservative. Some journals have begun piloting Statcheck as part of their peer review process. Statcheck is free software published under the GNU GPL v3.

== Validity ==
In 2017, Statcheck's developers published a preprint paper concluding that the program accurately identified statistical errors over 95% of the time. This validity study comprised more than 1,000 hand-checked tests among which 5.00% turned out to be inconsistent. The study found that Statcheck recognized 60% of all statistical tests. A reanalysis of these data found that if the program flagged a test as inconsistent, the decision was correct in 60.4% of cases. Reversely, if a test was truly inconsistent, Statcheck flagged it in an estimated 51.8% of cases (this estimate included the undetected tests and assumed that they had the same rate of inconsistencies as the detected tests). Overall, Statcheck's accuracy was 95.9%, half a percentage point higher than the chance level of 95.4% expected when all tests are simply taken at face value. Statcheck was conservatively biased (by about one standard deviation) against flagging tests.

More recent research has used Statcheck on papers published in Canadian psychology journals, finding similar rates of statistical reporting errors as the original authors based on a 30-year sample of such articles. The same study also found many typographical errors in online versions of relatively old papers, and that correcting for these reduced the estimated percent of tests that were erroneously reported.

== History ==
Statcheck was first developed in 2015 by Michele Nuijten of Tilburg University and Sacha Epskamp of the University of Amsterdam. Later that year, Nuijten and her colleagues published a paper using Statcheck on over 30,000 psychology papers and reported that "half of all published psychology papers [...] contained at least one p-value that was inconsistent with its test". The study was subsequently written up favorably in Nature. In 2016, Nuijten and Epskamp both received the Leamer-Rosenthal Prize for Open Social Science from the Berkeley Initiative for Transparency in the Social Sciences for creating Statcheck.

In 2016, Tilburg University researcher Chris Hartgerink used Statcheck to scan over 50,000 psychology papers and posted the results to PubPeer; they subsequently published the data they extracted from these papers in an article in the journal Data. Hartgerink told Motherboard that "We're checking how reliable is the actual science being presented by science". They also told Vox that they intended to use Statcheck to perform a function similar to a spell checker software program. Hartgerink's action also sent email alerts to every researcher who had authored or co-authored a paper that it had flagged. These flaggings, and their posting on a public forum, proved controversial, prompting the German Psychological Society to issue a statement condemning this use of Statcheck. Psychologist Dorothy V.M. Bishop, who had two of her own papers flagged by Statcheck, criticized the program for publicly flagging many papers (including one of her own) despite not having found any statistical errors in it. Other critics alleged that Statcheck had reported the presence of errors in papers that did not actually contain them, due to the tool's failure to correctly read statistics from certain papers.

Journals that have begun piloting the use of Statcheck as part of their peer review process include Psychological Science, the Canadian Journal of Human Sexuality, and the Journal of Experimental Social Psychology. The open access publisher PsychOpen has also used it on all papers accepted for publication in their journals since 2017.

== See also ==
- Abuse of statistics
- Misuse of p-values
- Metascience
