= How to Lie with Statistics =

Book by Darrell Huff

- Cover of the first edition
- Author: Darrell Huff
- Illustrator: Irving Geis
- Language: English
- Subject: Statistics; Social science
- Publisher: W. W. Norton & Company
- Publication date: 1954
- Publication place: United States
- Media type: Print
- Pages: 142
- ISBN: 0-393-31072-8
- Dewey Decimal: 311.2
- LC Class: HA29 .H82
- Text: How to Lie with Statistics at Internet Archive

How to Lie with Statistics is a book written by Darrell Huff in 1954, presenting an introduction to statistics for the general reader. Not a statistician, Huff was a journalist who wrote many how-to articles as a freelancer.

The book is a brief, breezy illustrated volume outlining the misuse of statistics and errors in the interpretation of statistics, and how errors create incorrect conclusions.

In the 1960s and 1970s, it became a standard textbook introduction to the subject of statistics for many college students. It has become one of the best-selling statistics books in history, with over one and a half million copies sold in the English-language edition. It has also been widely translated.

Themes of the book include "Correlation does not imply causation" and "Using random sampling." It also shows how statistical graphs can be used to distort reality. For example, by truncating the bottom of a line or bar chart so that differences seem larger than they are. Or, by representing one-dimensional quantities on a pictogram by two- or three-dimensional objects to compare their sizes so that the reader forgets that the images do not scale the same way the quantities do.

The original edition contained illustrations by artist Irving Geis. In a UK edition, Geis' illustrations were replaced by cartoons by Mel Calman.

== Background ==
Darrell Huff (1913–2001) was an American magazine editor and freelance writer who grew up in Gowrie, Iowa. He studied sociology and journalism at the University of Iowa, where he completed his bachelor's degree in 1938 and his master's degree in 1939. He worked as an editor at several magazines, including Look magazines and Better Homes and Gardens. In 1944 he moved to New York to work at Liberty, and in 1946 he returned to freelance writing and moved to California. Huff never had formal training in statistics.

How to Lie with Statistics was published by W. W. Norton in 1954 and comprised 142 pages long. In the acknowledgments, Huff states he collected his examples by asking for help through the American Statistical Association. Professional statisticians answered by sending him items from their own collections. He also took examples from several books on business statistics, public opinion, and graphs The introduction starts with a story about his father-in-law, who believed there was a lot of crime in California because of what the local newspaper reported. Huff then described the book as a guide to how statistics can mislead people. He states that honest readers need to learn these tactics to protect themselves. The illustrator was Irving Geis, who was born in 1908 and worked as a magazine illustrator. He later became best known for his drawings of molecules.

== Reception ==
Two reviews of How to Lie with Statistics appeared in The New York Times within two weeks in January 1954, one by Burton Crane on January 4 and one by Charles Poore on January 16. Steele describes both as favourable without adding much insight, and states a double review like this would be nearly impossible today. The Journal of the Institute of Actuaries reviewed the British edition in 1955. The reviewer wrote that, if read correctly, the book would be entertaining and helpful for thinking more clearly, at the same time, and that some parts would be useful to statisticians.

According to Reinhart, soon after the book was published, university courses began using it and it has never gone out of print. Steele calls it the most widely read statistics book in history. Reinhart describes it as "possibly the most popular book on statistics ever published". In 2005, Steele reported that more than half a million copies of the English edition had been sold. He also noted that translations had appeared over many years, including the first Chinese edition published in 2003 by the Department of Economics of Shanghai University. Reinhart gives a higher figure than Steele, saying the English edition had sold more than 1.5 million copies as of 2005.

Steele points to four things that probably explain the book's long success: its title, its illustrations, its writing style, and its content. He describes the writing as breezy and notes that a trained statistician might find the tone overly casual, though Huff's target audience wasn't statisticians. He adds that the book's cartoons, drawn by Geis, helped pave the way for cartoons in books on more serious subjects. On the title, Steele says it bothers many statisticians because it suggests their field can be used to lie. He still considers it fair, since people lie using statistics every day, and he gives Huff credit for calling out the media for doing so. He also reports a comment from Geis that a title like An Introduction to Statistics would only have produced modest sales for a short time, and that the actual title is what has kept the book selling since 1954.

== Legacy ==
Huff's book influenced later writers, including geographer Mark Monmonier, whose 1991 book How to Lie with Maps drew its title from How to Lie with Statistics. Monmonier had previously assigned Huff's work as supplementary reading in an information graphics course during the mid-1980s. He regarded misleading maps as one form of statistical misrepresentation. Monmonier also mentioned two reviews that compared his book with Huff's, taking these comparisons as an indicator that Huff's work was worth following.

Huff's approach to naming his book also appeared in later titles, including works about charts and maps. In 2005 sociologist Joel Best described Huff's work as the most widely recognized non-technical book encouraging readers to question statistical claims. Best concluded that Huff's book would continue to serve a useful purpose. Both Best and Monmonier contributed to a special section of Statistical Science published in 2005 that examined Huff's work and related statistical issues.

== See also ==
- How to Lie with Maps
- Lies, damned lies, and statistics
