= Methodological advisor =

Advisor on design and analysis of research studies

A methodological advisor or statistical consultant provides methodological and statistical advice and guidance to clients or colleagues interested in making decisions regarding the design of studies, the collection and analysis of data, and the presentation and dissemination of research findings. Trained in both methods and statistics, and communication skills, advisors may work in academia, industry, or the public sector.

== Education and employment ==
Methodological advisors generally have post-graduate training in statistics and relevant practical experience. Advisors may also have significant education and experience in the particular field they work in. Some universities offer specific graduate programmes in fields such as biostatistics, psychological methods, or methodology and statistics for the medical, behavioural, and social sciences.

Methodological consultants primarily find work in academia and industry. In the private sector, consultants may be part of an organisation, employed by a consultancy firm, or self-employed. Many universities offer in-house methodological advice for researchers, as well as, in some cases, services for outside clients. The advisors may also be researchers of their own right and be involved with particular projects. Project statisticians, in particular, are embedded with research groups and often developed a deep understanding not just of statistics, but also of the research topics themselves. In contrast, independent advisors are often only consulted on specific questions, and may be less involved with the project as a whole.

Disciplines in which methodological advice is sought stretch the entire width of the quantitative sciences, but may in particular include the medical sciences, biology, psychological research, and business studies. Advisors are also consulted in public administration, where they may be involved at all levels of governance. Within the legal system, consultants may be called upon as expert witnesses, in particular in cases that involve statistical considerations.

== Range of tasks ==
The role of a methodological advisors varies from project to project, but can include any point in the research cycle. While cross-sectional consulting may only occur at one point during a project, longitudinal consulting may mean that the advisor stays with the project from beginning to end. Hence, advice is not limited to statistical questions. Questions may concern the design of studies, choice or construction of measurement instruments, analysis of data, and presentation of results. Common questions include:

- design of experiments and research studies
- plotting data
- measurement instruments (choosing, constructing and analysing)
- determination of adequate sample size to detect a hypothesised effect
- determination of an adequate sampling procedure for a study, survey or experiment
- supervision of data collection to ensure elements of the population are being sampled correctly
- statistical analyses (e.g., analysis of variance, regression, etc.) of data to address research hypotheses
- the write-up of statistical results for grant proposals, manuscripts, professional conferences, or other presentations.

Giving methodological advice can mean answering specific questions or performing mundane data analyses. When clients have little understanding of research methods and statistics, consultants may have to clarify substantive questions and to translate them into methodological and statistical procedures. In private companies, the form of consultancy does not necessarily depend on the understanding of the client. Different companies may offer different forms of consulting, ranging from providing a quick fix for specific problems, provide extensive explanations to the client or even running the whole analyses.

In some cases, ethical considerations are a concern. The client's occupation may form a constraint for the form in which consultancy can be offered. Running data-analyses for companies may not be a problem, where doing this for a bachelors or masters student can be considered fraud.

== Skill set ==
Although statisticians were traditionally trained largely on a technical skill set, modern training focuses on more than methodological questions. It also emphasizes advisors to be proficient in communication, teamwork, and problem-solving skills. They have to be able to elicit explanations from clients and give clear explanations of methods and statistics themselves. Because in some cases the implications of methodological advice may be profound (e.g., it may not be possible to conduct certain experiments, or to gain certain insights from data already collected), consultants also have to be able to communicate such ramifications.

== See also ==
- Statistician
- Management consulting
