= Line chart =

Type of chart

Line chart showing the population of the town of Pushkin, Saint Petersburg from 1800 to 2010, measured at various intervals

A line chart or line graph, also known as curve chart, is a type of chart that displays information as a series of data points called 'markers' connected by straight line segments. It is a basic type of chart common in many fields. It is similar to a scatter plot except that the measurement points are ordered (typically by their x-axis value) and joined with straight line segments. A line chart is often used to visualize a trend in data over intervals of time – a time series – thus the line is often drawn chronologically. In these cases they are known as run charts.

== History ==
Some of the earliest known line charts are generally credited to Francis Hauksbee, Nicolaus Samuel Cruquius, Johann Heinrich Lambert and the Scottish engineer William Playfair. Line charts often display time as a variable on the x-axis. Playfair was one of the first to visualize data this way. In 1786, he plotted ten years of money spent by the Royal Navy. He supplemented the chart with a detailed description, telling his readers how to interpret the change over time because they were unfamiliar with this form of abstract visualization. In addition to line charts, Playfair invented and popularized bar charts and pie charts.

== Example ==
In the experimental sciences, data collected from experiments are often visualized by a graph. For example, if one collects data on the speed of an object at certain points in time, one can visualize the data in a data table such as the following:

Graph of speed versus time

Elapsed Time (s)	Speed (m s^{−1})
0	0
1	3
2	7
3	12
4	18
5	30
6	45.6

Such a table representation of data is a great way to display exact values, but it can prevent the discovery and understanding of patterns in the values. In addition, a table display is often erroneously considered to be an objective, neutral collection or storage of the data (and may in that sense even be erroneously considered to be the data itself) whereas it is in fact just one of various possible visualizations of the data.

Understanding the process described by the data in the table is aided by producing a graph or line chart of speed versus time. Such a visualisation appears in the figure to the right. This visualization can let the viewer quickly understand the entire process at a glance.

This visualization can however be misunderstood, especially when expressed as showing the mathematical function $v(t)$ that expresses the speed $v$ (the dependent variable) as a function of time $t$. This can be misunderstood as showing speed to be a variable that is dependent only on time. This would however only be true in the case of an object being acted on only by a constant force acting in a vacuum.

== Best-fit ==
A best-fit line chart (simple linear regression)

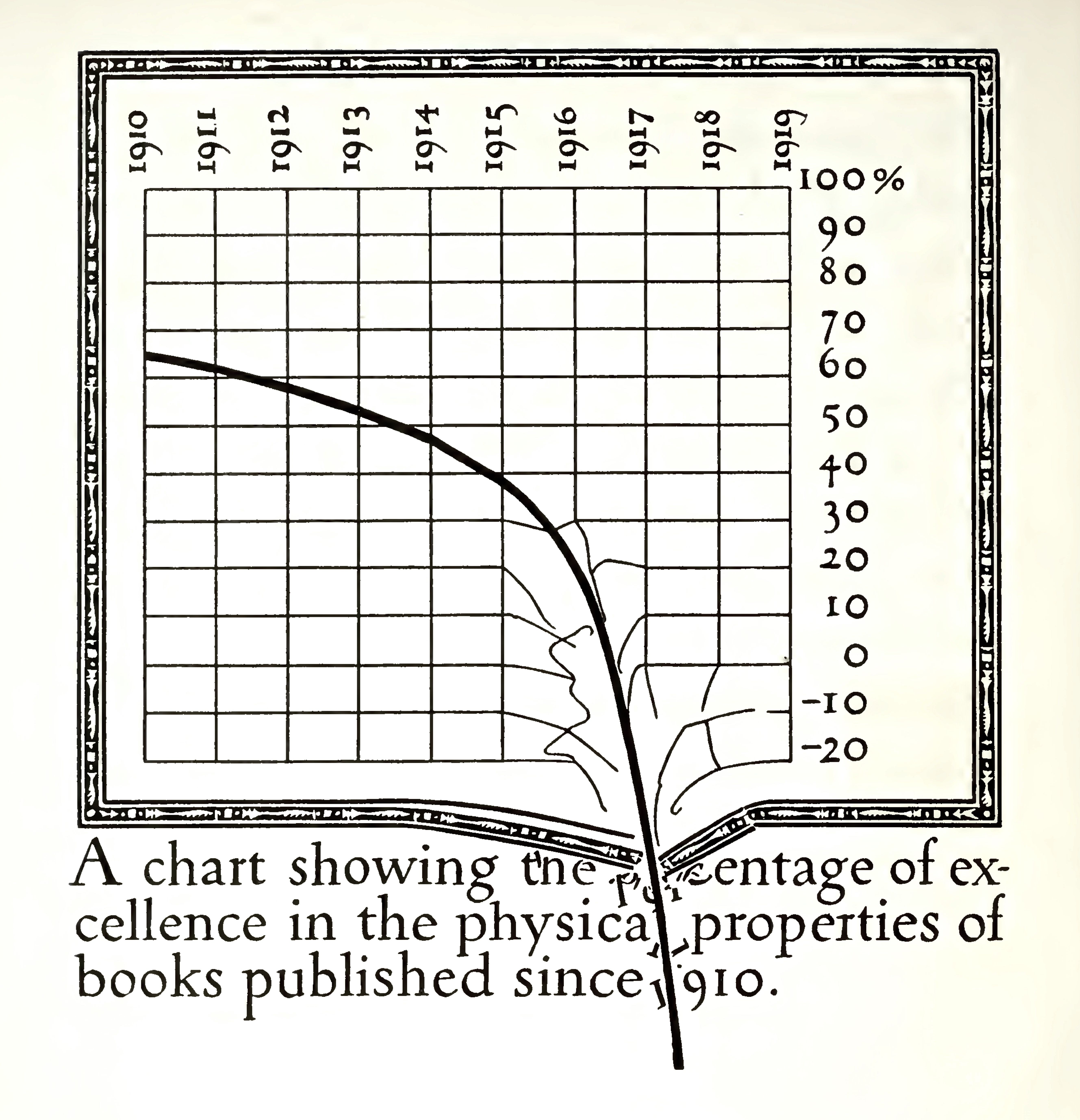
A parody line graph (1919) by William Addison Dwiggins.

Charts often include an overlaid mathematical function depicting the best-fit trend of the scattered data. This layer is referred to as a best-fit layer and the graph containing this layer is often referred to as a line graph.

It is simple to construct a "best-fit" layer consisting of a set of line segments connecting adjacent data points; however, such a "best-fit" is usually not an ideal representation of the trend of the underlying scatter data for the following reasons:

1. It is highly improbable that the discontinuities in the slope of the best-fit would correspond exactly with the positions of the measurement values.
2. It is highly unlikely that the experimental error in the data is negligible, yet the curve falls exactly through each of the data points.

In either case, the best-fit layer can reveal trends in the data. Further, measurements such as the gradient or the area under the curve can be made visually, leading to more conclusions or results from the data table.

A true best-fit layer should depict a continuous mathematical function whose parameters are determined by using a suitable error-minimization scheme, which appropriately weights the error in the data values. Such curve fitting functionality is often found in graphing software or spreadsheets. Best-fit curves may vary from simple linear equations to more complex quadratic, polynomial, exponential, and periodic curves.

== See also ==
- Curve fitting
- Data and information visualization
- List of information graphics software
- Run chart
- Chartjunk
