= Darrell Huff =

American writer (1913–2001)

- Born: July 15, 1913; Gowrie, Iowa
- Died: June 27, 2001 (aged 87); Carmel-by-the-Sea, California
- Education: University of Iowa
- Spouse: Frances Marie Nelson (m. 1937)
- Children: 4 daughters
- Writing career
- Notable work: How to Lie with Statistics

Darrell Huff (July 15, 1913 – June 27, 2001) was an American writer, and is best known as the author of How to Lie with Statistics (1954), the best-selling statistics book of the second half of the twentieth century.

== Career ==
Huff was born in Gowrie, Iowa, and educated at the University of Iowa, (BA 1938, MA 1939). Before turning to full-time writing in 1946, Huff served as editor of Better Homes and Gardens and Liberty magazine. As a freelancer, Huff produced hundreds of "How to" feature articles and wrote at least sixteen books, most of which concerned household projects. One of his biggest projects was a prize-winning home in Carmel-by-the-Sea, California, where he lived until his death.

== Personal life ==
Huff married Frances Marie Nelson in 1937. At her instigation, Huff gave up his editorial work (which had become a "rat race" for him) and they moved to California in 1946, bought ten acres in the Valley of the Moon. They built their own house, and later several more houses. Frances Marie would sometimes be Huff's co-author. They had four daughters. Two would assist with his last books.

== Social role and reception ==
Huff is credited with introducing statistics to a generation of college and high-school students through clear writing and amusing anecdotes, even though he had no formal training in statistics. His most famous book, How to Lie with Statistics, was "possibly the most popular book on statistics ever published". His books have been published in over 22 languages.

Huff also worked for the cigarette companies. Stanford historian Robert N. Proctor wrote that Huff "was paid to testify before Congress in the 1950s and then again in the 1960s, with the assigned task of ridiculing any notion of a cigarette-disease link. On March 22, 1965, Huff testified at hearings on cigarette labeling and advertising, accusing the recent Surgeon General's report of myriad failures and 'fallacies'."

Huff was later funded by the tobacco industry to publish a follow-up to his book on statistics: How to Lie with Smoking Statistics as a counterattack to the Surgeon General's 1964 Smoking and Health report. The book was intended to be published by Macmillan, but near the end of 1968, the plans for its publication came to an abrupt halt for unclear reasons. It was not until the Tobacco Master Settlement Agreement in 1998 that the existence of the book, letters between Huff and tobacco industry lawyers discussing it, and the entire unpublished manuscript itself became publicly available. Huff himself never gave an explanation why the project was stopped. Gelman (Columbia University) suggested Huff could have intentionally killed the project to save his reputation, but thinks we'll never know since the documents provide no clue.

== Selected bibliography ==
=== Books ===
- Huff, D. (1944). Pictures by Pete: A Career Story of a Young Commercial Photographer. Dodd, Mead, New York.
- Huff, D. (1945). Twenty Careers of Tomorrow. WhittleseyHouse, McGraw–Hill, New York.
- Huff, D. (1946). The Dog that Came True (illust. C. Moran and D. Thorne). Whittlesey House, McGraw–Hill, New York. (Adapted from a short story by Darrell Huff which appeared in Woman's Day.)
- Huff, D. (1954) How to Lie with Statistics (illust. I. Geis), Norton, New York, ISBN 0-393-31072-8
- Huff, D. (1959). How to Take a Chance: The Laws of Probability (illust. I. Geis). Norton, New York.
- Huff, D. (1961). Score: The Strategy of Taking Tests (illust. C. Huff). Appleton–Century Crofts, New York.
- Huff, D. (1964). Cycles in Your Life—The Rhythms of War, Wealth, Nature, and Human Behavior. Or Patterns in War, Wealth, Weather, Women, Men, and Nature (illust. A. Kovarsky). Norton, New York.
- Huff, D. (1968). How to Work With Concrete and Masonry (illust. C. and G. Kinsey). Popular Science Publishing, New York.
- Huff, D. (1972). How to Figure the Odds on Everything (illust. J. Huehnergarth). Dreyfus, New York.
- Huff, D. (1972). How to Save on the Home You Want (with F. Huff and the editors of Dreyfus Publications; illust. R. Doty). Dreyfus, New York.
- Huff, D. (1996). The Complete How to Figure It. Using Math in Everyday Life (illust. C. Kinsey; design K. M. Huff ). Norton, New York.
- Huff, D. and Corey, P. (1957). Home Workshop Furniture Projects. Fawcett, New York.
- Huff, D. and Huff, F. (1963). How to Lower Your Food Bills. Your Guide to the Battle of the Supermarket. Macfadden–Bartell, New York.
- Huff, D. and Huff, F. (1970). Complete Book of Home Improvement (illust. G. and C. Kinsey and Bray–Schaible Design, Inc.). Popular Science Publishing, New York.

=== Articles ===
- Huff, D. (1954). "How to Spot Statistical Jokers". The New York Times, August 22, 1954, p. SM13.
- Huff, D. (1962). "Living high on $6500 a year". The Saturday Evening Post 235 60–62. (Reprinted in Mother Earth News, January 1970)
- Huff, D. (1978). "Calcu-letter. News of pocket calculators—and how to have fun with them". Popular Science 212 (3), March 1978. p. 6

== See also ==
- Exaggeration
- Lies, damned lies, and statistics
