= RAWGraphs =

Open-source visualization software package

- Original authors: Giorgio Caviglia, Michele Mauri, Giorgio Uboldi, Matteo Azzi
- Developers: DensityDesign Lab, Studio Calibro, Studio InMagik
- Initial release: 20 April 2013; 12 years ago.
- Stable release: 2.0.0-beta11 / 18 October 2021; 4 years ago
- Written in: JavaScript, HTML
- Available in: English
- Type: Visualization
- License: Apache 2
- Website: rawgraphs.io
- Repository: github.com/rawgraphs/rawgraphs-app

RAWGraphs is a web-based open-source data visualization software made in JavaScript. It employs D3.js for the creation of editable visualizations in SVG format.

== History ==
The project was started in 2013 by a group of researchers of Politecnico di Milano with the original name of "RAW". Version 1.0.0 was released in 2014. In the same year the tool won the "Most Beautiful" award at the Kantar Information is Beautiful Awards 2014 organized by David McCandless.

In 2017 the project was re-launched thanks to private support. It changed the license from LGPL to Apache 2 and the project name to "RAWGraphs".

In August 2019 the team launched a crowdfunding campaign to harvest economical support for developing a new version of the tool. Version 2.0.0 was released in September 2020 to backers, and publicly in February 2021. The new version presents a modular architecture composed by a core JavaScript library, an expandable library of visual models, and a web-based GUI written in React.

== Applications ==
RAWGraphs has been used in a number of research projects in academia, and is used also by journalist and graphic designer thanks to its ability of creating clean, SVG-based images that can be further edited with any other software.

== Available charts ==
In version 2.0 the available charts are:

- Alluvial diagram
- Arc diagram
- Bar chart
  - Multi-set bar chart
  - Stacked bar chart
- Beeswarm plot
- Box plot
- Bumpchart
- Circle packing
- Dendrograms:
  - Circular dendrogram
  - Linear dendrogram
- Gantt chart
- Horizon graph
- Line chart
- Matrix Plot
- Parallel coordinates
- Radar chart
- Sankey diagram
- Scatterplots:
  - Bubble chart
  - Contour plot over bubble chart
  - Convex hull grouping
  - Hexagonal binning grouping
- Streamgraph (also known as Area chart)
- Sunburst diagram
- Treemap
- Violin plot
- Voronoi Diagram

== Data Inputs ==
the software can load data from the following sources:

- static files (CSV, TSV, Excel files)
- Data from endpoints (in tabular or JSON format)
- Data from SPARQL endpoints (e.g. Wikidata)
