= Rob Waller =

British information designer

Rob Waller is a British information designer, academic, and typographer. He founded the Information Design Journal in 1979 and co-founded the Information Design Association in 1991. He is currently president of the International Institute for Information Design (IIID)
