= Knud Lonberg-Holm =

Danish-American architect and photographer

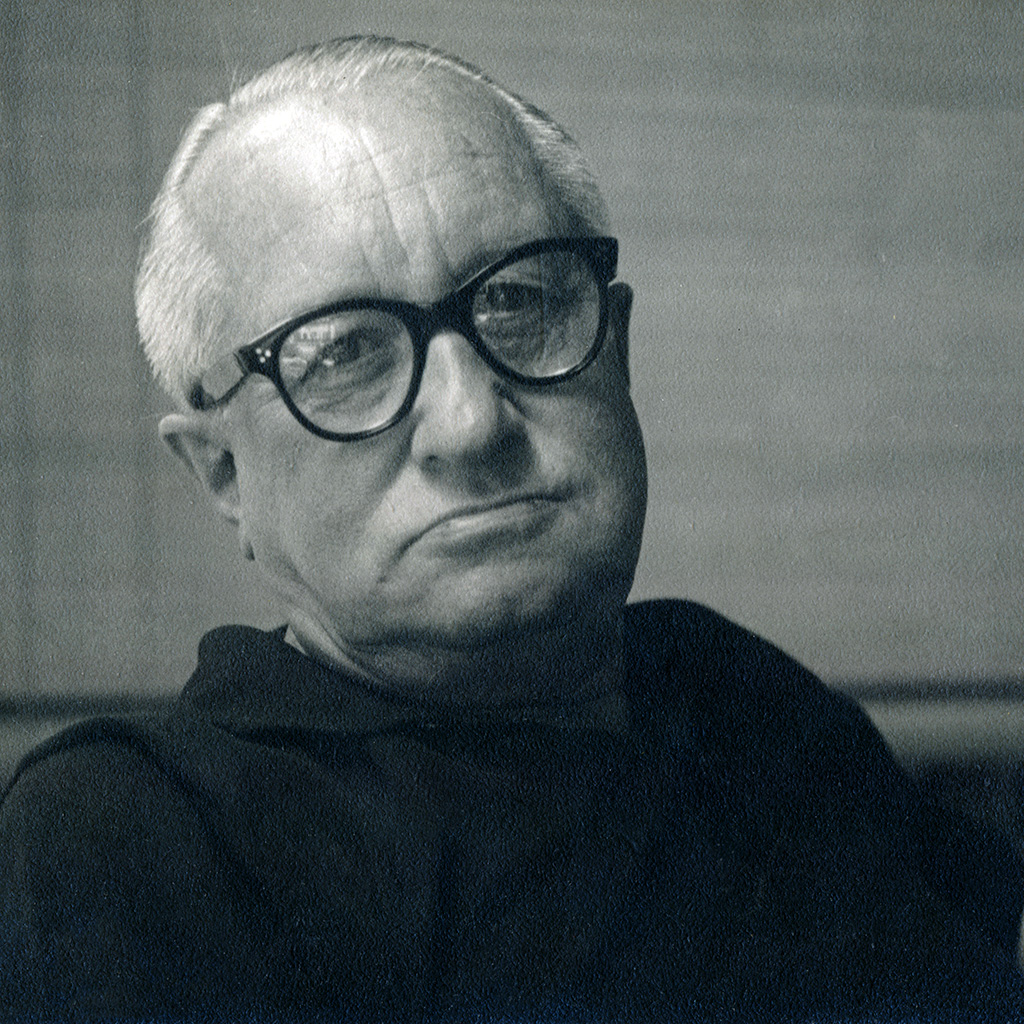
- Lonberg-Holm at 73, in 1968
- Born: January 15, 1895; Denmark
- Died: January 2, 1972 (aged 76); USA
- Citizenship: Denmark, USA
- Education: Royal Danish Academy of Fine Arts
- Known for: information design

Knud Lonberg-Holm (January 15, 1895 – January 2, 1972) was a Danish-American Modernist architect, photographer, and designer. He was called "the father of information design" and "one of Buckminster Fuller's greatest influences".

== Biography ==
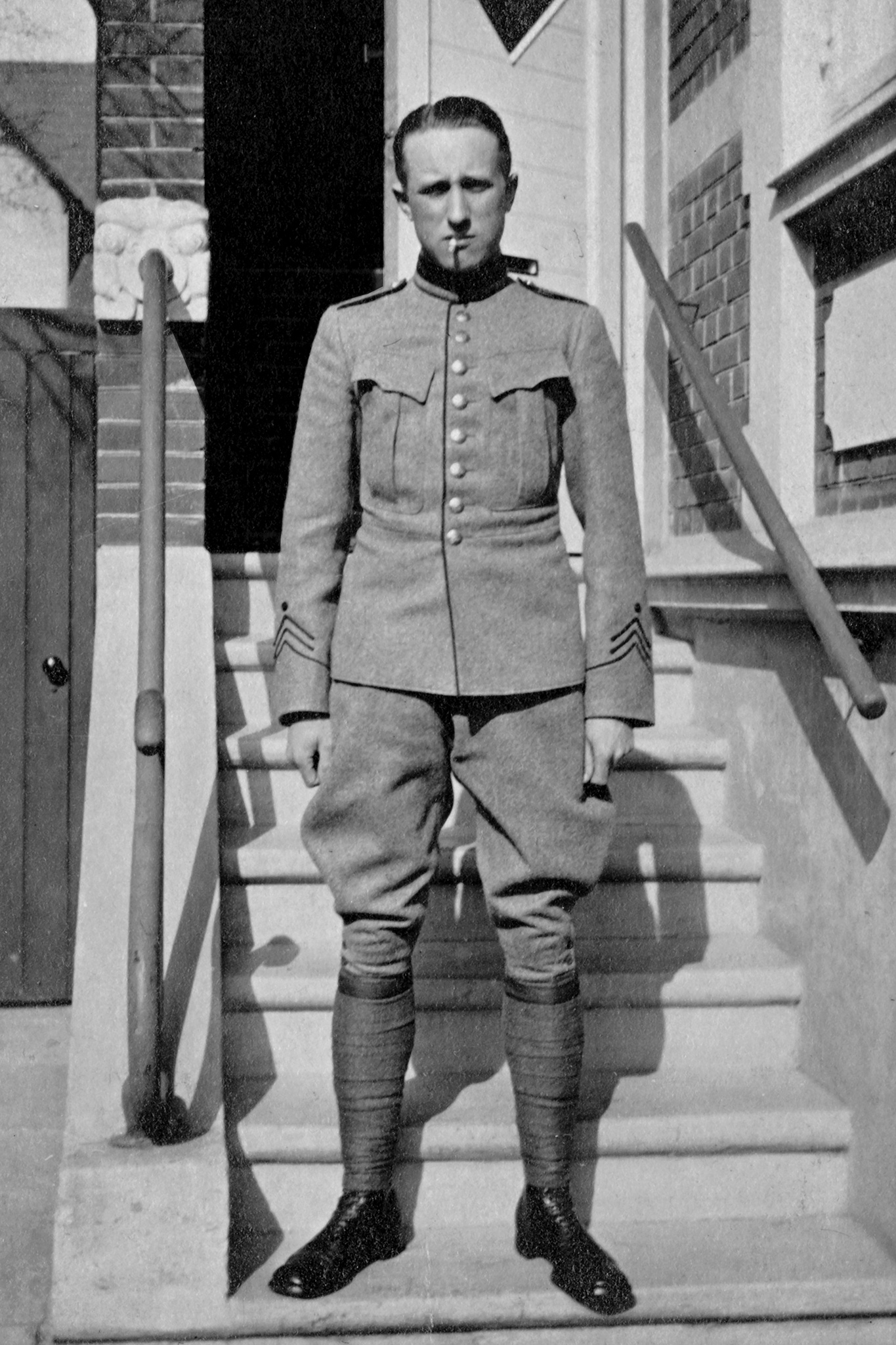
Lonberg-Holm in 1918

Knud Lonberg-Holm was born in 1895 in Denmark. From 1912 to 1915 he attended the Royal Danish Academy of Fine Arts, where he studied architecture and engineering. One of his early designs was of a shipyard in Copenhagen. His early works were associated with De Stijl and Berlin's Constructivist movements. Lonberg-Holm emigrated to the US in 1923. In 1924-25 he taught a course on design at the University of Michigan in Ann Arbor, based on Bauhaus ideas. He was one of the founders of the International Congress for Modern Architecture. In the 1920s he travelled through a number of American cities with a camera and "took worm's-eye views and extreme close-ups of skyscrapers, the back sides of buildings, fire escapes, billboards, and dazzling 'lightscapes', ignoring—for the most part—the facades of the buildings." Some of his photos were published in Erich Mendelsohn's 1926 book Amerika: Bilderbuch eines Architekten; he did not receive credits for his works in the first edition.

Lonberg-Holm worked at F.W. Dodge Corporation for more than 30 years. He, together with C. Theodore Larson, was commissioned to develop "a systematic approach to organizing the information needed by the building industry." This became known as an information design.

Buckminster Fuller called Lonberg-Holm a "really great architect of the Nysky (New York skyscraper) age". In his book Scope of Total Architecture, Walter Gropius, identified Lonberg-Holn and Richard Neutra, as "men of outstanding initiative" who were "carrying on" the Modern Movement in the United States of America.

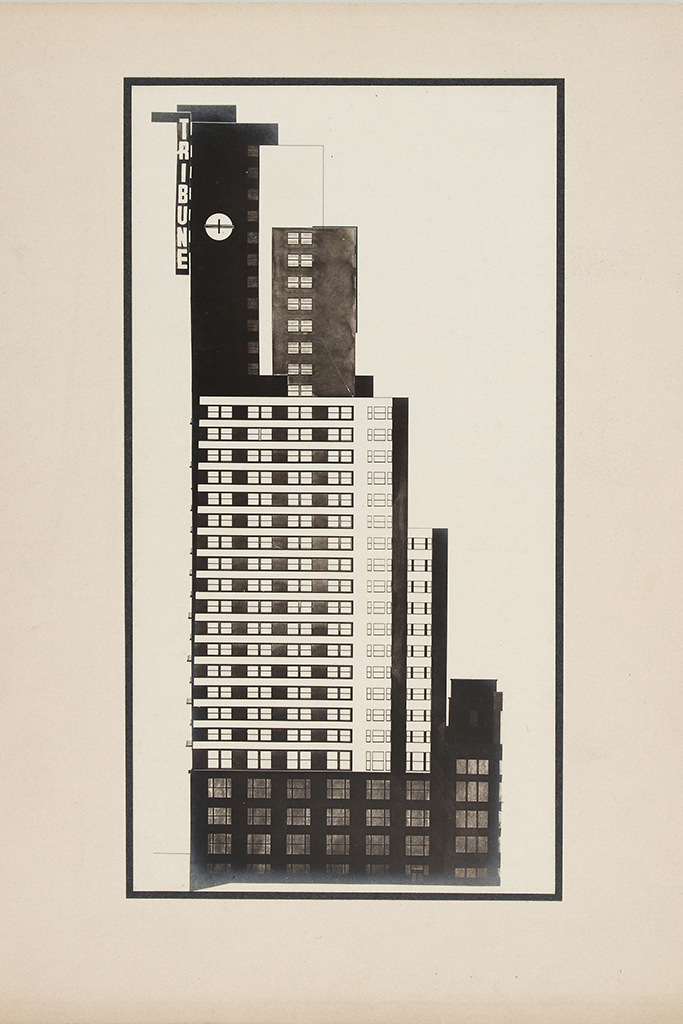
Chicago Tribune Tower project, 1922

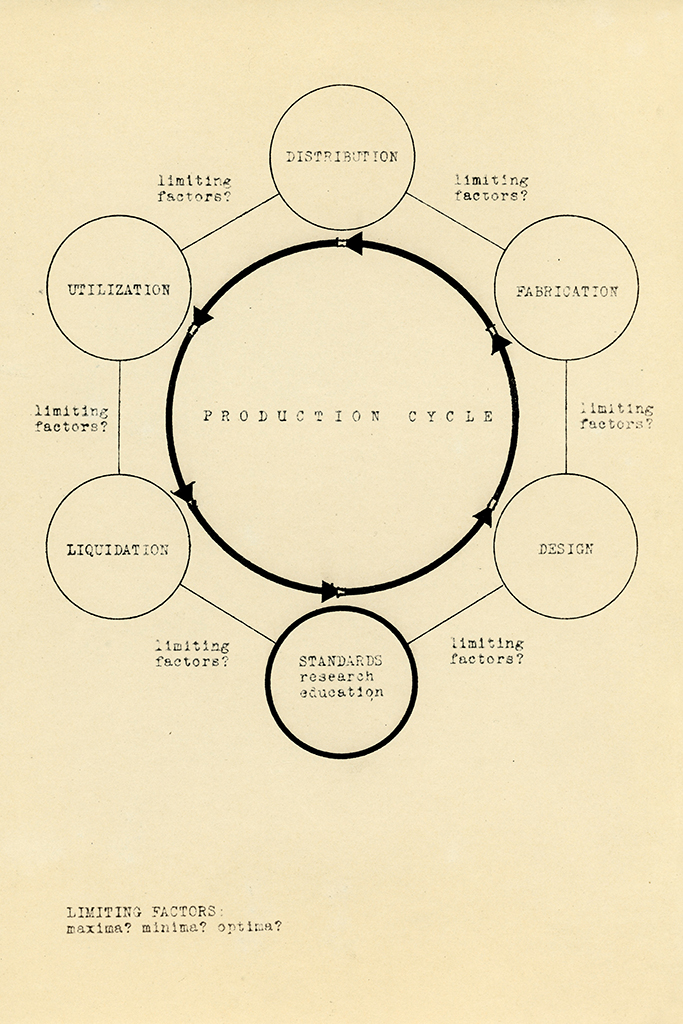
Production Cycle diagram by Lönberg-Holm, 1934

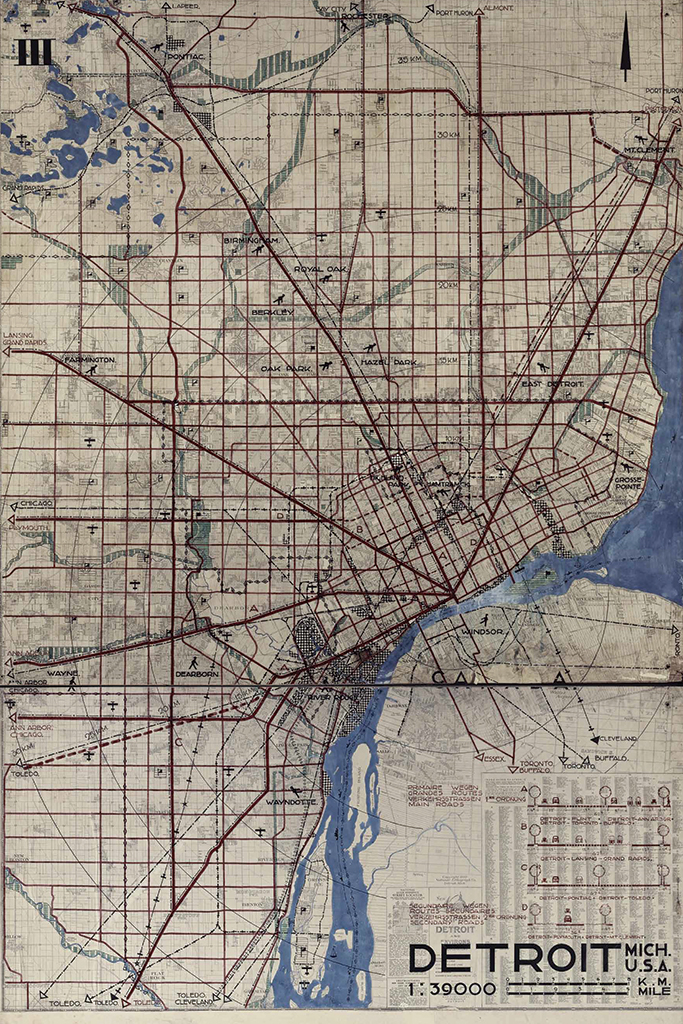
Analytic map of Detroit, 1932
