= Florida Probe =

Florida Probe is a type of probing and charting software used by dentists and dental hygienists to detect and diagnose periodontal disease. It may also help to track down the progress and results of trial treatments performed on controlled study patients.

== History ==
The software was developed by Florida Probe Corporation and released for the first time in 1987. It was created as a project for the University of Florida.

== System components ==
The Florida Probe system consists of a computerized USB probe, a footswitch, with digital readout, as well as the software proper.

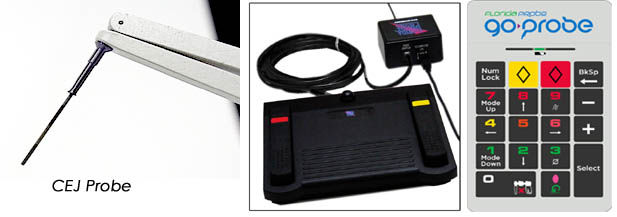

== Software features ==
- Customizable voice feedback (in different languages and genders)
- Robust SQL Express based Database Engine
- Tooth history and visits comparison charts
- Risk assessment, Summary reports, Plaque chart, Patient education videos
- Diagnosis Forms with Epad Signature support
- It can collect: Pocket Depth, Recession, Furcation, Plaque, Mobility, MGJ, Bleeding, Pus and more
- Ability to export all data to Excel format file
- Offline Mode
- Global Settings that apply to all workstations
- A complete patient record can be exported and imported using an encapsulated .FPC file
- Ability to link with over 40 different Practice Management Software providers, including Dentrix, DSN Software, Eaglesoft, Practiceworks, and Softdent

== See also ==
- Charting application
- Periodontal probe
- Medical practice management software
