= Carlotta Petrina =

American illustrator and printer

Carlotta K. Petrina (September 6, 1901 – December 11, 1997) was an American illustrator and printer, awarded a Guggenheim Fellowship in 1933 for her illustrations to accompany John Milton's Paradise Lost.

== Early life and education ==
Charlotte F. Kennedy was born in Kingston, New York, the daughter of Gilbert F. Kennedy (a lawyer) and Helen McCormick Kennedy (an illustrator). She was educated at the Art Students League and at Cooper Union in the 1920s.

== Career ==
Petrina won a Guggenheim Fellowship in 1933 (postponed until 1934) to do lithography in Paris. Her "beautiful but heartbreaking" illustrations for John Milton's Paradise Lost were published in 1936. The artist used herself as a model for Eve, and her late husband as the model for Adam, lending a particular intimacy and poignancy to the images. Milton scholar Virginia Tufte made a biographical film about Petrina, titled Reaching for Paradise: The Life and Art of Carlotta Petrina (1994).

Petrina also illustrated editions of Norman Douglas's South Wind (1932), Shakespeare's Henry VI, Part 2, and the John Dryden translation of Virgil's Aeneid (1944), She made some illustrations for an edition of Charles Dickens's Oliver Twist, but they were not used in the final publication. Drawings by Carlotta Petrina were included in the second Whitney Biennial in 1933. Among her quirkier projects, she illustrated a short humorous novel called Clovis by Michael Fessier (1948), about a parrot with human intelligence.

== Personal life and legacy ==
Charlotte Kennedy changed her name to Carlotta when she married fellow artist John Petrina in 1921. John was born Giovanni Antonio Secondo Petrina in Treviso, Italy. They had a son, Antonio. John died in 1935, in a car accident, while the Petrinas were traveling in Wyoming. Carlotta Petrina died in 1997, age 96, in Brownsville, Texas.

The Carlotta Petrina Museum and Cultural Center in Brownsville exhibits her works and other artifacts from her life, as well as hosting classes and performances.
