= Bernal chart =

A Bernal chart (bər′nal ′chärt) in crystallography, is a chart used for indexing X-ray diffraction photographs from single crystals. From such a chart may be read the axial and radial cylindrical coordinates of that point in reciprocal space which corresponds to any particular X-ray reflection.

When a single crystal is examined in an X-ray diffractometer such that the diffraction intensity is measured cylindrically around the crystal, it is convenient to use cylindrical coordinates to define the reciprocal lattice vectors and their terminal points. Different order reflections will be coaxial with the axis of rotation. These reflections are recorded as spots which lie on parallel lines known as layer lines. A reciprocal lattice vector can be represented by two mutually perpendicular vectors $\zeta$ (along the rotation axis) and $\xi$ in the horizontal plane (the plane perpendicular to the rotation axis) containing the X-ray beam. The third parameter specifying the reciprocal lattice vector is the angle $\phi$ formed by the X-ray beam and the plane containing $\zeta$ and $\xi$.

The vertical coordinate $\zeta$ has a special significance, since all the reciprocal lattice points which have a constant $\zeta$ value lie in the plane normal to the rotation axis. Such a plane corresponds to the oscillation line on the oscillation(rotation) photograph. Thus a layer line is characterized by a particular value $\zeta$. The zeroth layer line has $\zeta = 0$ (i.e., the equatorial layer line), the first layer line has $\zeta = \zeta_1$ and the second layer line has $\zeta = \zeta_2$, and so on. Alternatively the reciprocal lattice points lie a long a cylinder with a constant $\xi$ value whose axis is coincident with the rotation axis. If the crystal is mounted on the c-axis then the layer lines are related to the repeat distance along this axis. If H is the layer separation distance and R is the radius of the detector then

$\frac{H}{R} = \tan(\mu)$

where $\mu$ is the layer line angle.

Contours of constant $\zeta$ and $\xi$ are important in the interpretation of oscillation (rotation) measurements. A chart exhibiting such curves as they would appear on an X-ray photograph was first prepared by Bernal and is called a Bernal chart. The scale used in a given chart depends on the distance the detector is from the crystal. Historically, Bernal charts were provided in the form of transparencies so that they could be superimposed over X-ray photographic film which allowed the $\zeta$ and $\xi$ coordinates to be read directly from the film.

== See also ==
- Greninger chart
- John Desmond Bernal
