= Virginia Tufte =

American professor of English (1918–2020)

Virginia James Tufte
- Born: Virginia James; August 19, 1918; Meadow Grove, Nebraska
- Died: March 28, 2020 (aged 101); Beverly Hills, California
- Children: Edward Tufte

Academic background
- Education: A.B., University of Nebraska; M.A., Arizona State University; M.A. and Ph.D. University of California at Los Angeles

Virginia James Tufte (August 19, 1918 – March 28, 2020) was a writer and distinguished emerita professor of English at the University of Southern California. Her special fields were Milton, Renaissance poetry, and the history and grammar of English.

== Early life and education ==
Virginia James was born in Meadow Grove, Nebraska, one of the ten children of Micah Dickerson James and Sarah Elizabeth Bartee James. Both of her parents were from Virginia. She attended Midland College and worked as a reporter at the Omaha World-Herald and the Nebraska State Journal as a young woman.

After marriage, Tufte pursued further education, earning a bachelor's degree from the University of Nebraska in 1944, a master's degree from Arizona State University, and master's and doctoral degrees in English literature from the University of California, Los Angeles. Her 1964 dissertation was titled "Literary Backgrounds and Motifs of the Epithalamium in English to 1650".

== Career ==
Tufte was a member of the English faculty of the University of Southern California for 25 years, beginning in 1964, and retiring in 1989. At USC, she won teaching awards and was a co-founder of several interdisciplinary programs. She was perhaps best known for Grammar as Style (1971), which developed a new following several decades after it had gone out of print, prompting her to write its successor, Artful Sentences: Syntax as Style (2006).

Besides her work on syntax and style, Tufte was notable for books and essays in two other areas of literary study and for a video biography. Her book The Poetry of Marriage: The Epithalamium in Europe and its Development in England (1970), a comprehensive history of the English epithalamium, grew from her doctoral research. She also made studies of artists as interpreters of John Milton's poems. Besides numerous essays and contributions to books in this field, some in collaboration with Wendy Furman-Adams of Whittier College, she wrote and produced a one-hour video biography of a literary illustrator Reaching for Paradise: The Life and Art of Carlotta Petrina (1994) that has appeared on educational television stations, is archived in college and university libraries, and is in use in classrooms.

Tufte's interest in life and family histories is reflected also in two collaborative books with anthropologist Barbara Myerhoff, Changing Images of the Family (1981) and Remembered Lives: The Work of Ritual, Storytelling and Growing Older (1992).

== Personal life ==
Virginia James married Edward E. Tufte in Omaha in 1940; her husband was city engineer and public works director of the city of Beverly Hills, California, for many years. Their son is renowned statistician and political scientist Edward Rolf Tufte. Virginia was widowed when her husband died in 1999. She died at her home in Beverly Hills in 2020, at the age of 101 years.

== Bibliography ==
- Virginia James Tufte (2013). Pieces: Embroidered by Memory. Illustrated by Anna Lackaff. Cheshire, CT: Graphics Press.
- Artful Sentences: Syntax as Style. Cheshire, CT: Graphics Press. 2006. ISBN 0-9613921-8-5.
- Reaching for Paradise: The Life and Art of Carlotta Petrina (video biography). Los Angeles. 1994.
- Virginia Tufte; Barbara Meyerhoff, eds. (March 1981). Changing Images of the Family. Yale Univ Press. ISBN 0-300-02671-4.
- Grammar as Style. Holt, Rinehart and Winston. 1971. ISBN 0-03-079615-6.
- Virginia Tufte; Garrett Stewart (1971). Grammar as Style: Exercises in Creativity. Holt, Rinehart and Winston. ISBN 0-03-085041-X.
- Virginia Tufte, ed. (1970). High Wedlock Then Be Honoured. Viking Press. ISBN 0-670-37159-9.
- The Poetry of Marriage: The Epithalamium in Europe and its Development in England. University of Southern California Studies in Comparative Literature. 1970. ISBN 0-87252-012-9.
- Virginia Tufte; Joseph Aurbach; Philip H. Cook; Robert E. Kaplan (1968). Transformational Grammar: A Guide for Teachers. Washington Educational Research Associates.
