= Edward Tufte =

American statistician (born 1942)

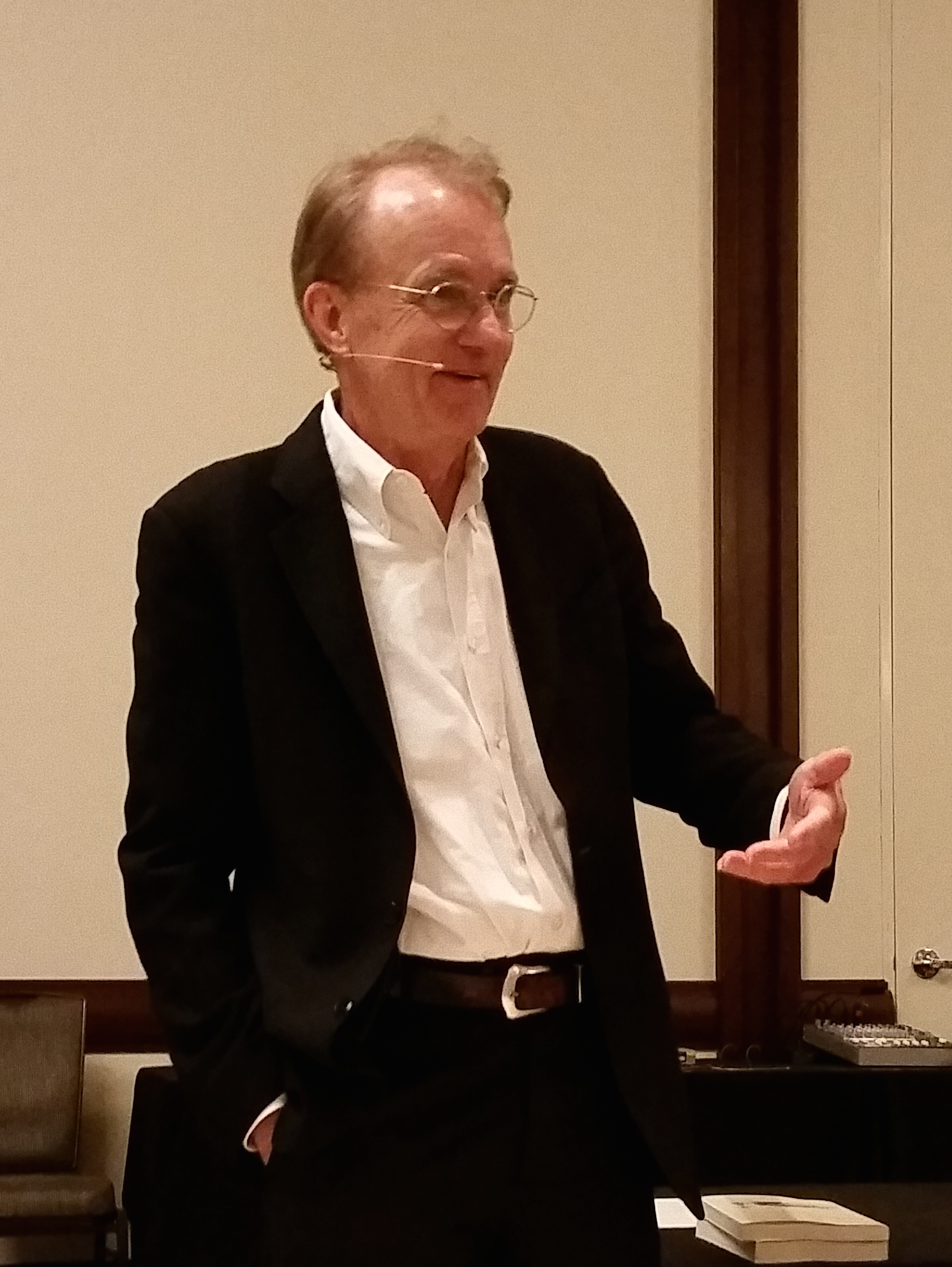
- Tufte (age 73) during his one-day course in Dallas, May 21, 2015
- Born: March 14, 1942 (age 84); Kansas City, Missouri
- Education: Stanford University (BS, MS); Yale University (PhD)
- Occupations: Professor, statistician, writer, sculptor
- Writing career
- Notable works: Visual Explanations, Beautiful Evidence, Envisioning information, The Visual Display of Quantitative Information; Seeing with Fresh Eyes: Meaning, Space, Data, Truth
- Scientific career
- Thesis: The Civil Rights Movement and Its Opposition (1968)
- Doctoral advisor: Robert Dahl
- Website: edwardtufte.com

Edward Rolf Tufte (/ˈtʌfti/; born March 14, 1942), sometimes known as "ET", is an American statistician and professor emeritus of political science, statistics, and computer science at Yale University. He is noted for his writings on information design and as a pioneer in the field of data visualization.

== Early life and education ==
Edward Rolf Tufte was born in 1942 in Kansas City, Missouri, to Virginia Tufte (1918–2020) and Edward E. Tufte (1912–1999). He grew up in Beverly Hills, California, where his father was a longtime city official. He graduated from the public Beverly Hills High School.

Tufte received a BS and a MS in statistics from Stanford University, and a Doctor of Philosophy in political science from Yale University. His dissertation was completed in 1968 and titled The Civil Rights Movement and Its Opposition.

== Career ==
Tufte was hired in 1967 by the Woodrow Wilson School of Princeton University as a lecturer in politics and public affairs, where he steadily moved up to the rank of full Professor in 1972. He taught courses there in political economy and data analysis while publishing three quantitatively inclined political science books.

In 1975, while at Princeton, Tufte was asked to teach a statistics course to a group of journalists who were visiting the school to study economics. He developed a set of readings and lectures on statistical graphics, which he further developed in joint seminars he taught with renowned statistician John Tukey, a pioneer in the field of information design. These course materials became the foundation for Tufte's first book on information design, The Visual Display of Quantitative Information.

In 1977, Tufte left Princeton University for Yale University, where he accepted an appointment as Professor of Political Science, Statistics, and Computer Science, as well as a Senior Critic at the Yale School of Art.

After negotiations with major publishers failed, Tufte decided to self-publish the book The Visual Display of Quantitative Information in 1982, working closely with graphic designer Howard Gralla. Tufte financed the work by taking out a second mortgage on his home. The book quickly became a commercial success and secured Tufte's transition from political scientist to information expert.

In 1999, after 22 years of service at Yale University, his professorship at Yale was made Emeritus.

On March 5, 2010, President Barack Obama appointed Tufte to the American Recovery and Reinvestment Act's Recovery Independent Advisory Panel "to provide transparency in the use of Recovery-related funds".

== Infographic work ==
Tufte is an expert in the presentation of infographics such as charts and diagrams, and is a fellow of the American Statistical Association. He has held fellowships from the Guggenheim Foundation and the Center for Advanced Study in the Behavioral Sciences.

=== Information design ===
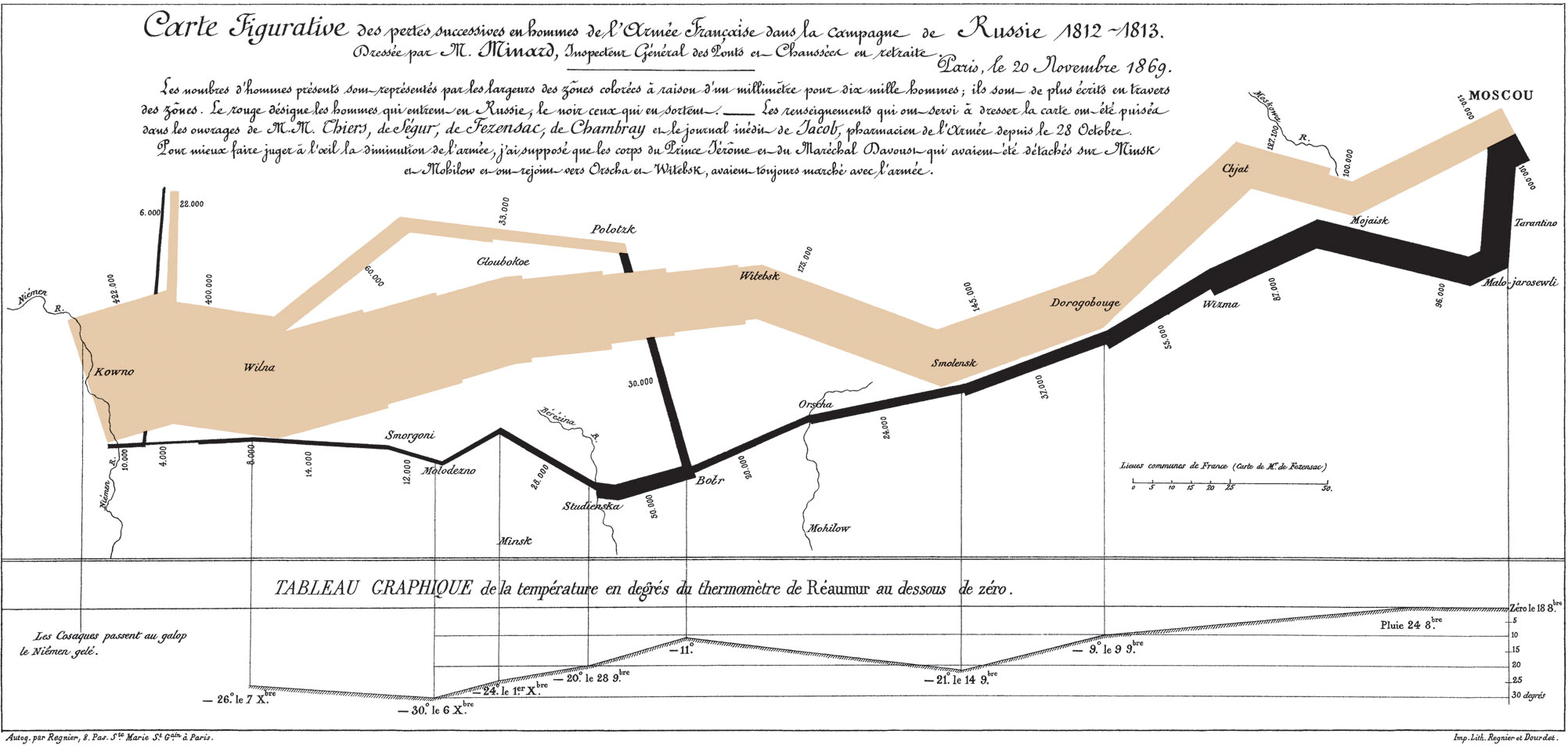
Tufte described Charles Joseph Minard's 1869 graphic of Napoleonic France's invasion of Russia as what "may well be the best statistical graphic ever drawn", noting that it captures six variables in two dimensions.

Tufte's writing is important in such fields as information design and visual literacy, which deal with the visual communication of information. He coined the word chartjunk to refer to useless, non-informative, or information-obscuring elements of quantitative information displays. Tufte's other key concepts include what he calls the lie factor, the data-ink ratio, and the data density of a graphic.

Tufte uses the term "data-ink ratio" to argue against using excessive decoration in visual displays of quantitative information. In Visual Display, Tufte explains, "Sometimes decoration can help editorialize about the substance of the graphic. But it is wrong to distort the data measures—the ink locating values of numbers—in order to make an editorial comment or fit a decorative scheme."

Tufte encourages the use of data-rich illustrations that present all available data. When such illustrations are examined closely, every data point has a value, but when they are looked at more generally, only trends and patterns can be observed. Tufte suggests these macro/micro readings be presented in the space of an eye-span, in the high resolution format of the printed page, and at the unhurried pace of the viewer's leisure.

Tufte uses several historical examples to make his case. These include John Snow's cholera outbreak map, Charles Joseph Minard's Carte Figurative, early space debris plots, Galileo Galilei's Sidereus Nuncius, and Maya Lin's Vietnam Veterans Memorial. For instance, the listing of the names of deceased soldiers on the black granite of Lin's sculptural memorial is shown to be more powerful as a chronological list rather than as an alphabetical one. The sacrifice each fallen individual has made is thus highlighted within the overall time scope of the war. In Sidereus Nuncius, Galileo presents the nightly observations of the moons of Jupiter in relation to the body itself, interwoven with the two-month narrative record.

=== Criticism of PowerPoint ===
Tufte has criticized the way Microsoft PowerPoint is typically used. In his essay "The Cognitive Style of PowerPoint", Tufte criticizes many aspects of the software:

- Its use as a way to guide and reassure a presenter, rather than to enlighten the audience;
- Its unhelpfully simplistic tables and charts, a design decision holdover from the low resolution of early computer displays;
- The outliner's causing ideas to be arranged in an artificially deep hierarchy, itself subverted by the need to restate the hierarchy on each slide;
- Enforcement of the audience's lockstep linear progression through that hierarchy (whereas with handouts, readers could browse and relate items at their leisure);
- Poor typography and chart layout, from presenters who are poor designers or who use poorly designed templates and default settings (in particular, difficulty in using scientific notation);
- Simplistic thinking—from ideas being squashed into bulleted lists; and stories with a beginning, middle, and end being turned into a collection of disparate, loosely disguised points—presenting a misleading façade of objectivity and neutrality that people associate with science, technology, and "bullet points".

Tufte cites the way PowerPoint was used by NASA engineers in the events leading to the Space Shuttle Columbia disaster as an example of PowerPoint's many problems. The software style is designed to persuade rather than to inform people of technical details. Tufte's analysis of a NASA PowerPoint slide is included in the Columbia Accident Investigation Board’s report – including an engineering detail buried in small type on a crowded slide with six bullet points, that if presented in a regular engineering white paper, might have been noticed and the disaster prevented.

Instead, Tufte argues that the most effective way of presenting information in a technical setting, such as an academic seminar or a meeting of industry experts, is by distributing a brief written report that can be read by all participants in the first 5 to 10 minutes of the meeting. Tufte believes that this is the most efficient method of transferring knowledge from the presenter to the audience and then the rest of the meeting is devoted to discussion and debate.

=== Small multiple ===
One method Tufte encourages to allow quick visual comparison of multiple series is the small multiple, a chart with many series shown on a single pair of axes that can often be easier to read when displayed as several separate pairs of axes placed next to each other. He suggests this is particularly helpful when the series are measured on quite different vertical (y-axis) scales, but over the same range on the horizontal x-axis (usually time).

=== Sparkline ===
Earliest known implementation of sparklines, around January 1998 by interaction designer Peter Zelchenko for programmer Michael Medved and the QuoteTracker application (sold to TD Ameritrade).

Sparklines are a condensed way to present trends and variation, associated with a measurement such as average temperature or stock market activity, often embedded directly in the text; for example: The Dow Jones index for February 7, 2006 . These are often used as elements of a small multiple with several lines used together. Tufte explains the sparkline as a kind of "word" that conveys rich information without breaking the flow of a sentence or paragraph made of other "words" both visual and conventional. To date, the earliest known implementation of sparklines was conceived by interaction designer Peter Zelchenko and implemented by programmer Mike Medved in early 1998.

== Sculpture ==
Beyond his academic endeavors over the years, Tufte has created sculptures, often large outdoor ones made of metal or stone, that were first primarily exhibited on his own rural Connecticut property. In 2009–10, some of these artworks were exhibited at the Aldrich Contemporary Art Museum in Ridgefield, Connecticut, in the one-man show Edward Tufte: Seeing Around.

=== Hogpen Hill Farms ===
Hogpen Hill Farms, the 234-acre (95-hectare) Tufte sculpture garden in Woodbury, Connecticut, is open to the public on summer weekends.

=== ET Modern ===
In 2010, Edward Tufte opened a gallery, ET Modern, in New York City's Chelsea Art District at 11th Avenue and 20th Street. The gallery closed in 2013.

== Bibliography ==
=== Works on political economy ===
- Brody, Richard A.; Tufte, Edward R. (March 1964). "Constituent-Congressional Communication on Fallout Shelters: The Congressional Polls". Journal of Communication. 14 (1): 34–39. doi:10.1111/j.1460-2466.1964.tb02345.x.
- Ekman, Paul; Tufte, Edward R.; Archibald, Kathleen; Brody, Richard A (June 1966). "Coping with Cuba: Divergent Policy Preferences of State Political Leaders". The Journal of Conflict Resolution. 10 (2): 180–97. doi:10.1177/002200276601000203. S2CID 154210702.
- Tufte, Edward R. (1968), The Civil Rights Movement and Its Opposition (PhD thesis).
- ——— (July 1969). "Improving Data Analysis in Political Science". World Politics. 21 (4). Cambridge University Press: 641–54. doi:10.2307/2009670. JSTOR 2009670. S2CID 153793854.
- ———; Reed, John Shelton (Winter 1969–1970). "A Note of Caution in Using Variables That Have Common Elements". The Public Opinion Quarterly. 33 (4): 622–6. doi:10.1086/267756.
- ———; Kish, Ed L. (1970). Some statistical problems in research design. The Quantitative Analysis of Social Problems. Reading, MA: Addison–Wesley.
- Edward R. Tufte reviewed work: Palumbo, Dennis J. (September 1970). "Statistics in Political and Behavioral Science". Journal of the American Statistical Association. 65 (331): 1414–5. doi:10.2307/2284317. JSTOR 2284317.
- ———; Dahl, Robert (1973), Size & Democracy: The Politics of the smaller European democracies, Stanford, CA, US: Stanford University Press, ISBN 0-8047-0834-7.
- ——— (June 1973). "The Relationship between Seats and Votes in Two-Party Systems". The American Political Science Review. 67 (2): 540–54. doi:10.2307/1958782. JSTOR 1958782. S2CID 33920492.
- ——— (1974), The Political Manipulation of the Economy: Influence of the Electoral Cycle on Macroeconomic Performance and Policy (unpublished manuscript), Department of Politics, Princeton University.
- ——— (1974), Data Analysis for Politics and Policy, Prentice Hall College Div, ISBN 0-13-197525-0.
- Lemieux, Peter H.; Kort, Fred; Pfotenhauer, David; Stewart, Philip R; Burnham, Walter Dean; Tufte, Edward R. (March 1974). "Communications". The American Political Science Review. 68 (1): 202–13. doi:10.1017/S0003055400235478. S2CID 251095897.
- Tufte, Edward R. (June 1974). "Electoral Reform: An Introduction". Policy Studies Journal. 2 (4): 240–2. doi:10.1111/j.1541-0072.1974.tb00406.x.
- ———; Sun, Richard A (1974). "Are there Bellwether Electoral Districts?". Public Opin Q. 39 (1): 1–18. doi:10.1086/268196.
- ——— (November 1975). "Electronic Calculators and Data Analysis: A Consumer's Report on the SR-51, HP-21, HP-55, and HP-65". American Journal of Political Science. 19 (4): 783–94. doi:10.2307/2110727. JSTOR 2110727.
- ——— (1977). "Improving Data Display". Dept. Of Statistics. University of Chicago.
- ——— (March 1977). "Political Statistics for the United States: Observations on Some Major Data Sources". The American Political Science Review. 71 (1): 305–14. doi:10.2307/1956972. JSTOR 1956972. S2CID 144587924.
- ——— (1978), Political Control of the Economy, Princeton, NJ: Princeton University Press, ISBN 0-691-07594-8.
- ——— (January 1979). "Political Parties, Social Class, and Economic Policy Preferences". Government and Opposition. 14 (1): 18–36. doi:10.1111/j.1477-7053.1979.tb00240.x. S2CID 153921242.
- Edward R. Tufte reviewed work: Shultz, George P.; Dam, Kenneth W. (June 1979). "Economic Policy Beyond the Headlines". The American Political Science Review. 73 (2): 605. doi:10.2307/1954949. JSTOR 1954949. S2CID 146954589.
- Edward R. Tufte reviewed work: Cohen, Jacob; Cohen, Patricia (December 1979). "Applied Multiple Regression/Correlation Analysis for the Behavioral Sciences". Journal of the American Statistical Association. 74 (368): 935. doi:10.2307/2286442. JSTOR 2286442.
- Hoffman, David; Matisse, Henri; Tufte, Edward R (1987). "The computer-aided discovery of new embedded minimal surfaces". The Mathematical Intelligencer. 9 (3): 8–21. doi:10.1007/BF03023947. S2CID 121320768.
- Edward R. Tufte reviewed work: Rose, Richard; Peters, Guy (June 1980). "Can Government Go Bankrupt?". The American Political Science Review. 74 (2): 567–8. doi:10.2307/1960736. JSTOR 1960736. S2CID 144477006.
- ——— (1985). Evidence Selection in Statistical Studies of Political Economy: The Distribution of Published Statistics (unpublished manuscript)..
- ——— (November 1987). "Dynamic Graphics for Data Analysis: Comment". Statistical Science. 2 (4): 389–92. doi:10.1214/ss/1177013109.
- ——— (November 1988). "A Conversation with Cuthbert Daniel". Statistical Science. 3 (4): 413–24. doi:10.1214/ss/1177012760.

=== Works of analytic design ===
- Tufte, Edward R (2001) [1983], The Visual Display of Quantitative Information (2nd ed.), Cheshire, CT: Graphics Press, ISBN 0-9613921-4-2.
- ——— (June 1990). "Data-Ink Maximization and Graphical Design". Oikos. 58 (2): 130–144. Bibcode:1990Oikos..58..130T. doi:10.2307/3545420. JSTOR 3545420.
- ——— (2001b) [1990], Envisioning Information, Cheshire, CT: Graphics Press, ISBN 0-9613921-1-8.
- ——— (1991). Dequantification in scientific visualization: Is this science or television. New Haven, CT: Yale University.
- ——— (1993). "Design of a cancer atlas". National Center for Health Statistics Contract Report.
- Powsner, SM; Tufte, Edward R (August 1994). "Graphical Summary of Patient Status". Lancet. 344 (8919): 386–9. doi:10.1016/S0140-6736(94)91406-0. PMID 7914312. S2CID 6144051.
- ———; Tufte, Edward R (1997). "Summarizing clinical psychiatric data". Psychiatr Serv. 48 (11): 1458–61. doi:10.1176/ps.48.11.1458. PMID 9355175.
- Tufte, Edward R (1997), Visual Explanations: Images and Quantities, Evidence and Narrative, Cheshire, CT: Graphics Press, ISBN 0-9613921-2-6.
- ——— (2003), "PowerPoint is evil", Wired, vol. 11, no. 9, ISSN 1059-1028.
- ——— (2003), The Cognitive Style of PowerPoint, Cheshire, CT: Graphics Press, ISBN 0-9613921-6-9.
- ——— (2006), Beautiful Evidence, Cheshire, CT: Graphics Press, Bibcode:2006beev.book.....T, ISBN 0-9613921-7-7.
- ——— (2020), Seeing With Fresh Eyes, Cheshire, CT: Graphics Press, ISBN 978-0-9613921-9-2.

=== Exhibitions ===
- Visual Explanations: Prints and Sculptures, 2000–1, New York: Artists Space.
- Escaping Flatland, Los Angeles: Architecture+Design Museum, 7 November 2002 – 13 February 2003, archived from the original on November 16, 2012.
- Seeing Around, June 13, 2009, to April 11, 2010, Ridgefield, Connecticut: Aldrich Contemporary Art Museum, archived from the original on May 19, 2011. Unavailable 19 Feb. 2020.

Awards
Preceded by John Chapline	ACM SIGDOC Rigo Award; 1992	Succeeded by Jay Bolter
