= Information Design Association =

The Information Design Association (IDA) was launched at a meeting chaired by Nick Ross at the Royal Society of Arts in London on 14 May 1991. in the belief that 'Good information design results in the clear and effective presentation of information. It combines skills in graphic design, writing, and human factors to make complex information easier to understand.'

A multi-disciplinary membership organisation for practitioners, the public interest and all those interested in information design, it has organised many evening meetings with visiting speakers, and a number of Information Design Conferences (the first five of which had been run by the Information Design Journal (IDJ), which had many links with the IDA), most recently in 2014.

Writing at the end of the 1990s, Robert E. Horn summed up the IDA's international contribution in its first decade:

In the history of information design a unique place must be reserved for the Information Design Society [sic]. As far as I can tell, this group invented and popularized the term information design. Its conferences have brought together users from several disciplines: design practitioners, researchers in psychology and education, computer graphics specialists, and teachers. Many practitioners of information design in the United States are members of this organization, as there is no comparable association in their own country. The society's Information Design Journal, currently edited by Paul Stiff, has been a major source of coherence for development of the profession.
