= Charting application =

A charting application is a computer program that is used to create a graphical representation (a chart) based on some non-graphical data that is entered by a user, most often through a spreadsheet application, but also through a dedicated specific scientific application (such as through a symbolic mathematics computing system, or a proprietary data collection application), or using an online spreadsheet service.

This type of application has been available for over three decades, as of 2026; Microsoft Works 4.0 was used for Windows 95.

There are several online charting services available, including the U.S. Department of Education's Institute of Education Sciences NES Chart

== See also ==
- List of information graphics software
