= Area chart =

Type of chart

Stacked area chart

Layered area chart

An area chart or area graph displays graphically quantitative data. It is based on the line chart. The area between axis and line are commonly emphasized with colors, textures and hatchings. Commonly one compares two or more quantities with an area chart.

== History ==
William Playfair is usually credited with inventing the area charts as well as the line, bar, and pie charts. His book The Commercial and Political Atlas, published in 1786, contained a number of time-series graphs, including Interest of the National Debt from the Revolution and Chart of all the Imports and Exports to and from England from the Year 1700 to 1782 that are often described as the first area charts in history.

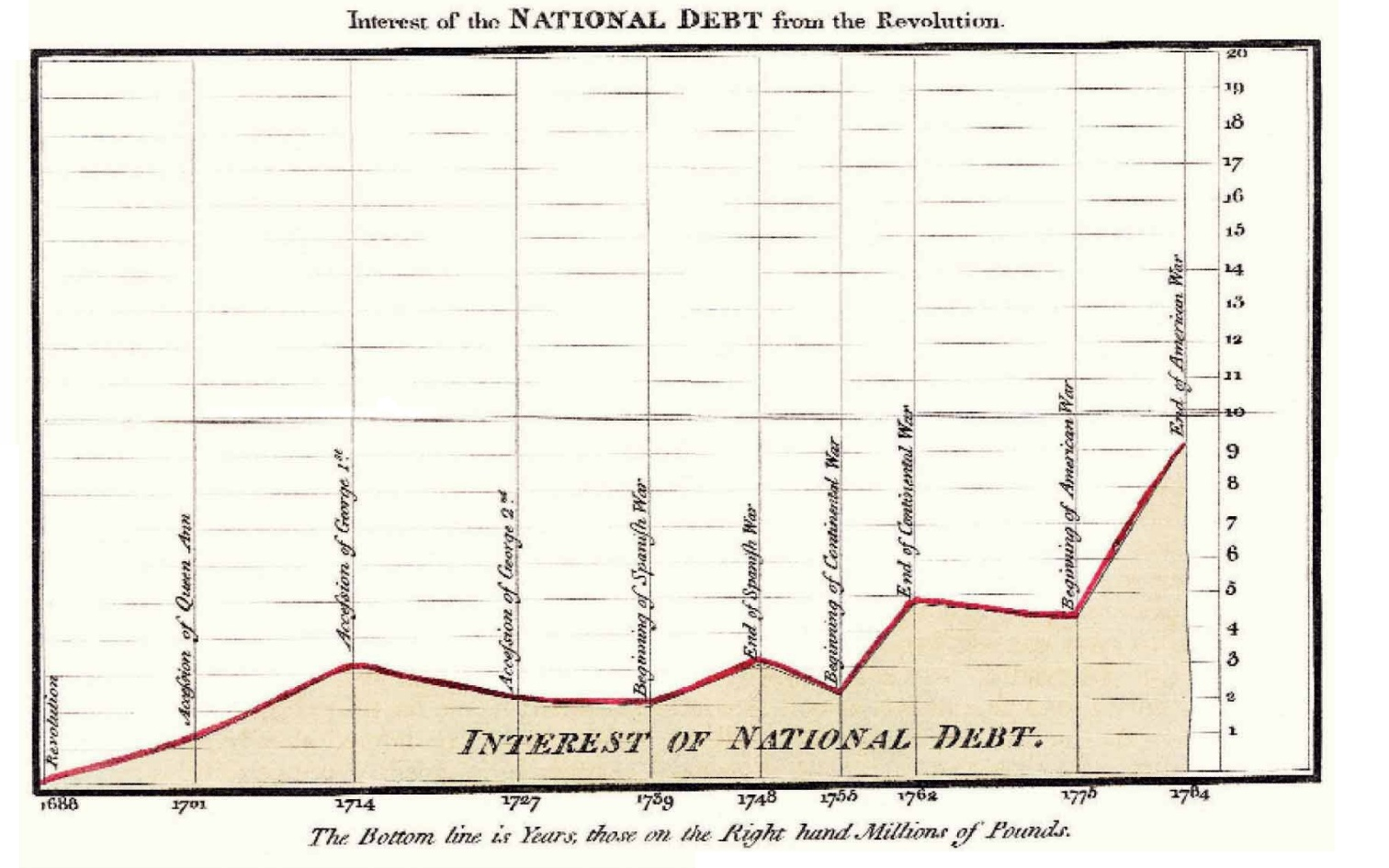
Interest of the National Debt from the Revolution (Playfair, 1786)

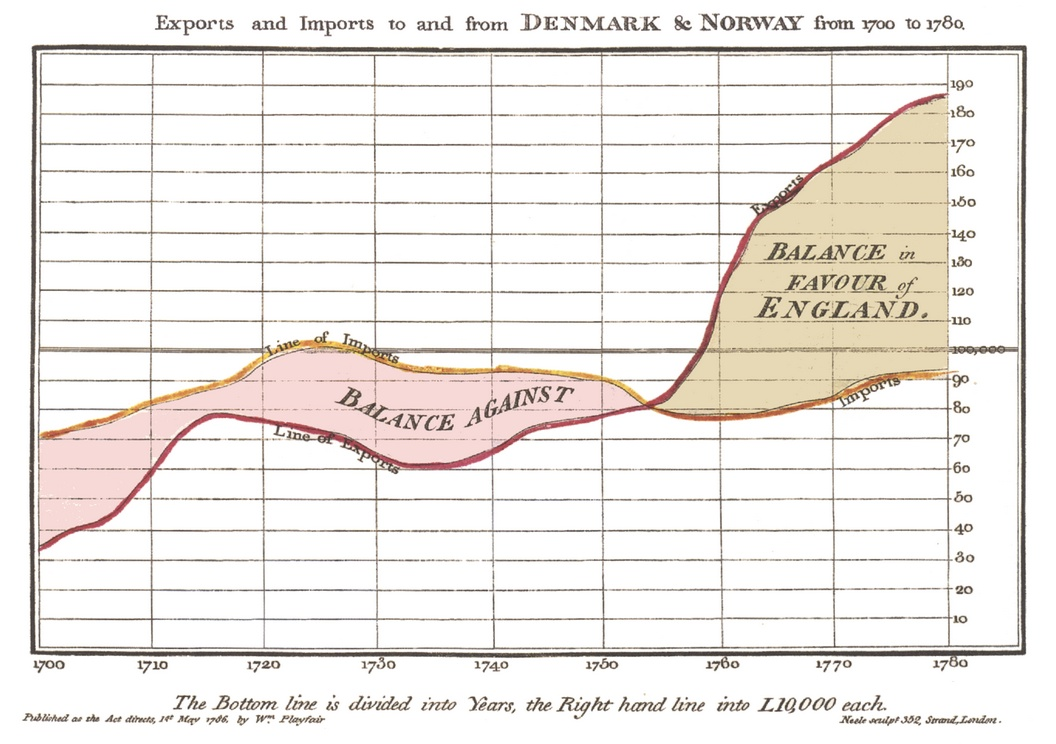
Exports and imports to and from Denmark & Norway from 1700 to 1780 (Playfair, 1786)

== Common uses ==
Area charts are used to represent cumulated totals using numbers or percentages (stacked area charts in this case) over time. Use the area chart for showing trends over time among related attributes. The area chart is like the plot chart except that the area below the plotted line is filled in with color to indicate volume.

When multiple attributes are included, the first attribute is plotted as a line with color fill followed by the second attribute, and so on.

== Variations ==
Area charts which use vertical and horizontal lines to connect the data points in a series forming a step-like progression are called step-area charts.

Area charts in which data points are connected by smooth curves instead of straight lines are called spline-area charts.

Stacked area charts in which the area is displaced around the central axis are called streamgraphs.
