= Ebba Lövenskiold =

Swedish journalist and education activist

Ebba Lövenskiold (born 7 October 1977) is a Swedish journalist and education activist. She has been covering film and entertainment for Swedish newspapers and magazines from New York City since 2008.

== Together for Better ==
She is the founder of the Together for Better Foundation, a charity working for kids' right to education. Through the foundation, Ebba builds and supports schools for underprivileged children in the Dominican Republic. Ebba started the project after having vacationed on the island when the devastating earthquake hit Haiti in 2010. The charity funded the construction of three schools.

== Family ==
Ebba Lövenskiold married Sam Giertz 2007 in Maglehem Church in Skåne County, and they live with their children at Borrestad Manor in Degeberga, Kristianstad Municipality, which was built by her maternal great grandfather, Count Jacob De la Gardie (1884-1970).
