= Sam Giertz =

Swedish Entrepreneur

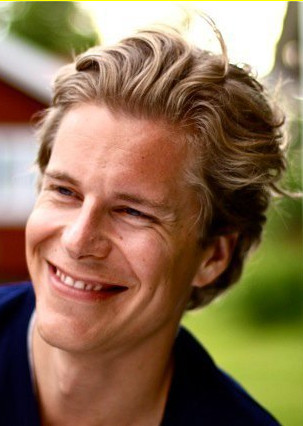
- Born: Sam Christian Giertz
- Education: Stockholm School of Economics
- Occupation: Businessman
- Years active: 1999–present
- Spouse: Ebba Lövenskiold (m. 2007)
- Relatives: Lars Magnus Ericsson (great grandfather), Albert Köhl (great grandfather), Bo Giertz (great-uncle)

Sam Giertz is a Swedish entrepreneur.

After working a year on the Swedish company DGC One, belonging to his brother David Giertz, Sam Giertz completed a Master of Science from Stockholm School of Economics, and moved to the US.

In New York City in 1999, Giertz co-founded Panopticon Software with Willem De Geer, Markus Skyttner, and Ludvig Sandman, where Giertz was Head of Global Sales and CEO, until 2013, when Panopticon was acquired by Datawatch Corporation. In 2008 he launched a Swedish fine dining water concept, Nordaq Fresh, and in 2010 he launched Your Special Delivery Service, both in the US, where he is still chairman of the Nordaq board.

2014 Giertz developed an exclusive luxury resort of villas in Dominican Republic. Back in Sweden, he co-founded Resona Group 2016 with his brother David Giertz. Resona is a Swedish real estate developer with its own prefab factory, and construction company. In 2023 Giertz was elected President for the Swedish women's handball club Kristianstad Handboll from Kristianstad.

== Family ==
Sam Giertz married Ebba Lövenskiold 2007 in Maglehem Church in Skåne County, and they live with their children at Borrestad Manor in Degeberga, Kristianstad Municipality.
