= Maglehem =

Coordinates: 55°46′19″N 14°09′02″E

- Town
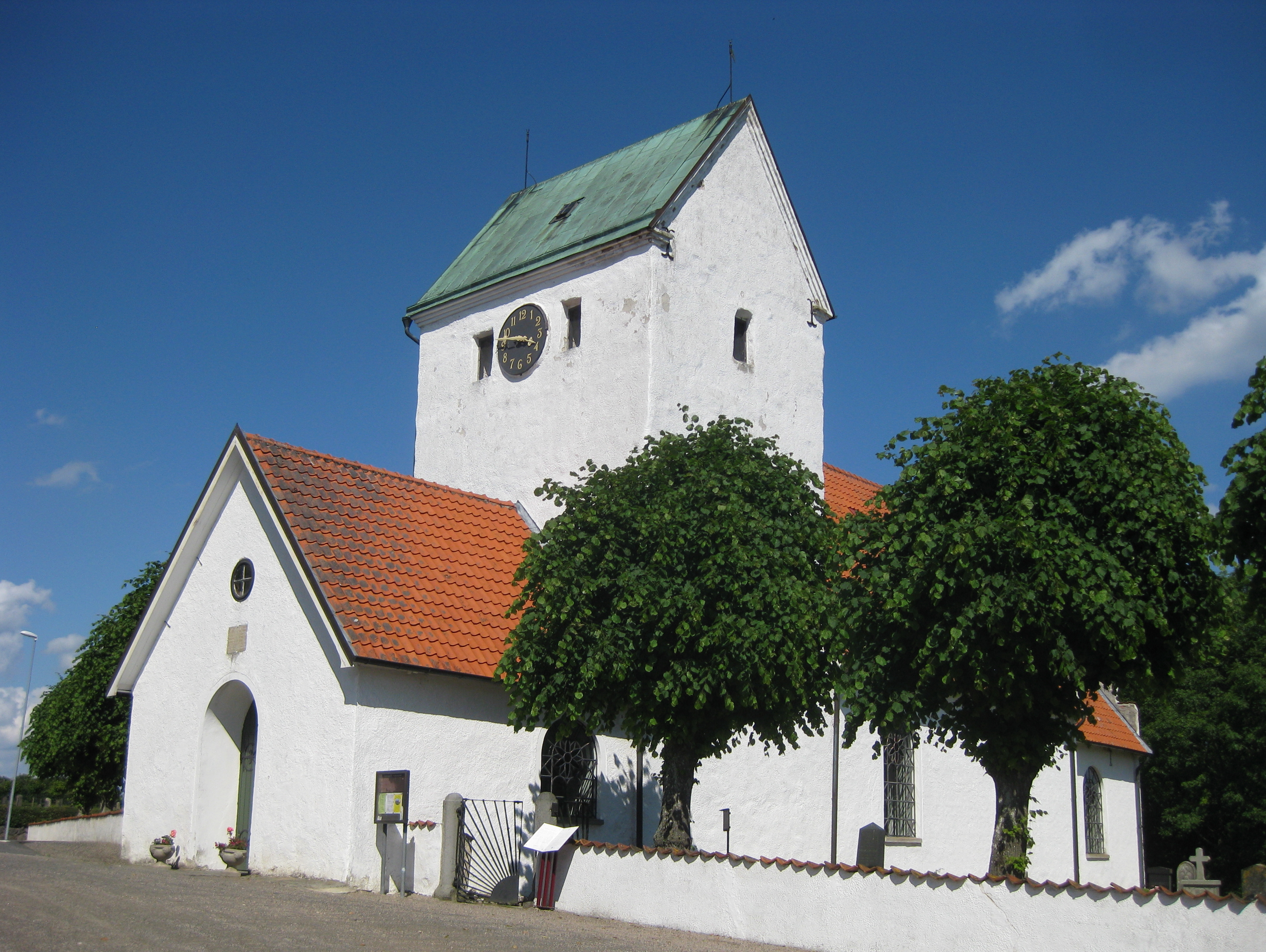
- Maglehems Kyrka
- Interactive map of Maglehem

Maglehem is a town in Sweden. It is located in the Kristianstad Municipality, inside of the Skåne region. It is classified as a småort by the Swedish Census. The town has an area of 65±0.5 hectares. It has a population of 136 as of the most recent count in 2023.

== History and Notable People ==
Maglehem used to be its own Municipality starting in 1863, but it was merged into the Degeberga Municipality in 1952. It was finally absorbed along with Degeberga into the Kristianstad Municipality in the final 1974 Municipality merger.

=== Maglehems Kyrka ===
Many well-preserved medieval murals are present inside of Maglehems Kyrka, a church that has been standing since around 1250. The church has been enlarged and rebuilt several times, but the original foundation still stands.

=== Art History ===
Maglehem is where the Swedish annual open studio art festival named Konstrundan (translates to "art tour") originated. The first Konstrundan was in 1968, where Curt Hillfon, Lars Wikström, Ivar Ekelund, Arne Lindqvist, Rudi Ramon, and Bengt Fredriksson let the public into their studios on Easter weekend. Eventually, this idea of letting the public tour artists' studios spread around Sweden, with it becoming an annual event hosted by the swedish art organization ÖSKG in 2008. Anna Rochegova, a Russian painter, made many works of Maglehem and the surrounding areas. She now works with ÖSKG and helps organize the Konstrundan.

=== Maglehem Volunteer Fire Brigade ===
Being a rural and low population town, Maglehem did not have a firefighting brigade until 1940. Before it was created, fires were fought using only hand pumps and buckets. Eventually they acquired a Ford truck, which they converted into a fire truck. At this time, they served the Maglehem and Brösarp municipalities, but when they merged with Kristianstad, they fought fires for the entire Municipality. In 1989, the fire brigade was disbanded. The workers were upset with this, so they funded a non-profit fire organization made up of volunteers. They still exist today and regularly cooperate with the Kristianstad Rescue Squad.
