= Panopticon Software =

Data visualization software company

Panopticon Software (now part of Altair Engineering)
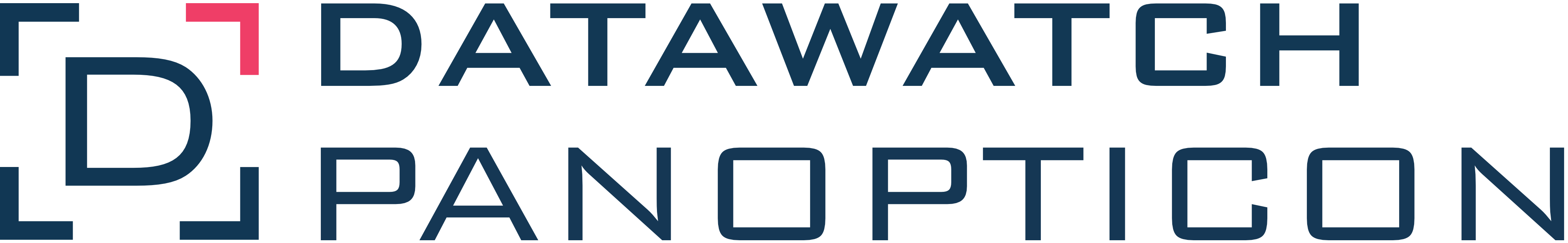
- Logo following acquisition by Datawatch
- Company type: Public
- Industry: Computer software
- Founded: Stockholm, Sweden (1999)
- Founder: Willem De Geer, Markus Skyttner, Ludvig Sandman, Sam Giertz
- Headquarters: Troy, MI, USA
- Number of locations: 48 (Worldwide)
- Area served: North America, South America, Europe, Asia, Africa
- Products: Panopticon Streaming Analytics Platform
- Website: Altair Data Analytics

Panopticon Software (now part of Altair Data Analytics) was a multi-national data visualization software company specializing in monitoring and analysis of real-time data. The firm was headquartered in Stockholm, Sweden. It partnered with software companies, including SAP, Thomson Reuters, Kx Systems, and One Market Data (OneTick). The company's name is derived from the Greek: 'pan' for all, 'optic' for sight. The company name is derived from the word panopticon which is an architectural concept originally intended to facilitate surveillance of prisons.

In December 2018, Panopticon was acquired by Altair Engineering as part of its acquisition of Datawatch Corporation.

Panopticon Software was a key player in the data visualization sector along with for example Qliktech, Tableau Software and Tibco Software. Its Swedish origins are shared with GapMinder, Qliktech and Spotfire, making Sweden a centre for Information Visualization research and development.

Panopticon products are optimized for use with real-time data message buses, complex event processing engines, relational databases, and column-oriented databases and is widely used to support electronic trading operations within global banks, asset managers, and exchanges. Panopticon tools are also often embedded in other enterprise applications using the company's software development kit.

== History ==
The company was founded in 1999 as a wholly owned subsidiary of the emerging markets brokerage Brunswick Direct before being spun off as a separate entity in 2002. It later was acquired by the UK based Hamsard Group (Hamsard is now known as Cantono Plc), and became a subsidiary of the Group. In March 2007 its competitor Spotfire undertook negotiations with Hamsard Group, to take full ownership of Panopticon. This potential deal was not completed, Spotfire pulling out of negotiations, and itself subsequently being purchased by Tibco. In May 2007 the company was sold back to its founders as part of a management buyout.

In May 2012, the company announced that QlikTech had partnered with Panopticon to enable QlikTech clients to embed Panopticon data visualizations into their QlikView dashboards. Panopticon supports QlikView desktop, web, and mobile interactive dashboards and allows users to filter and interact directly with real-time data.

In June 2012, the company announced that SAP was utilizing its Panopticon data visualization tools as the front end for real-time deployments of the SAP HANA in-memory appliance.

In April 2013, Panopticon was selected for inclusion in UBM Tech Channel's CRN 2013 Big Data 100 list. The Big Data 100 recognizes innovative technology vendors that help businesses manage "Big Data"—the rapidly increasing volume, variety and velocity of information being generated today. The list covers three categories: business analytics, data management, infrastructure and services. The Big Data 100 includes many established vendors as well as startups and specialized suppliers of niche products that help businesses address Big Data needs.

In April 2013, Panopticon was named a Gartner "Cool Vendor" in the Cool Vendors for In-Memory Computing 2013 report by Gartner, Inc. The April 23, 2013 report was co-authored by Roy Schulte, Roxane Edjlali, et al. This is the first year that Gartner has called out In-Memory Computing specifically as a subject for one of its Cool Vendor reports.

In August 2013, Datawatch Corporation (NASDAQ-CM: DWCH) announced that it had completed its acquisition of Panopticon Software AB.

In December 2018, Altair Engineering Inc (NASDAQ: ALTR) announced that it had completed its acquisition of Datawatch Corporation.

== Pre-attentive processing ==
Panopticon is designed to allow analysts to utilize Pre-Attentive Processing to identify anomalies and outliers in large amounts of fast-changing data. Pre-Attentive Processing is a term from the area of human cognitive psychology and refers to the ability of the low-level human visual system to rapidly identify certain basic visual properties. Examples of visual features that can be detected in this way include hue, intensity, enclosure, orientation, size, and motion.

== Technology overview ==
Panopticon's technology relies on in-memory OLAP cubes, which are displayed through a series of visualizations including treemapping. This allows the user to load data, select variables and hierarchical structures, and navigate through the resultant visualization, filtering, zooming and drilling (sometimes called slicing and dicing), to identify outliers, correlations and trends.

Its streaming OLAP implementation takes an in-memory OLAP cube and allows data to be streamed through it. This combination makes the company's products attractive to industry verticals that require live streaming data, such as financial data of international markets, utility grid monitoring and telecommunications network traffic analysis. This is very different than the vast majority of OLAP implementations in which cubes are rebuilt periodically for new batches of data.

This support for streaming data with its products has allowed financial institutions such as JPMorgan Chase, Citigroup, Citadel, and BlackRock to implement the Panopticon within their real-time trading and risk applications. Euromoney has stated that it provides the trader community with a way of quickly digesting information.
