= Anna Rochegova =

- Born: Moscow
- Education: Surikov Moscow State Art Academy
- Notable work: "Rut and Erik Nilsson, Farmers from Skåne, 2012", "New Yorkers on Their Way, 2021"
- Children: Alexander Ionov
- Website: https://www.annarochegova.com/index.html

Anna Rochegova-Cederholm was born in Moscow to Maria Engelke and Alexander Rochegov. Her mother was a painter, and her father was an architect. Rochegova graduated from Surikov Moscow State Art Academy with high honors. She currently lives and paints in Maglehem, Sweden, where she has lived for 20 years. She has a son named Alexander Ionov, who has two children of his own. She also works for ÖSKG, where she participates in the annual Konstrundan.

== Art and techniques ==
Rochegova mostly paints with oil paints on canvas, but she does use other techniques such as collage and lithography. A frequent traveler, she often paints the places she visits, including New York City, Österlen, and Normandy. Her art is now held in private collections around the world. She has also written many articles, including "World of Painting," where many famous artists in Moscow are shown at the exhibition hall of the Moscow Society of Artists.
