= Maglehem Church =

- Maglehems kyrka
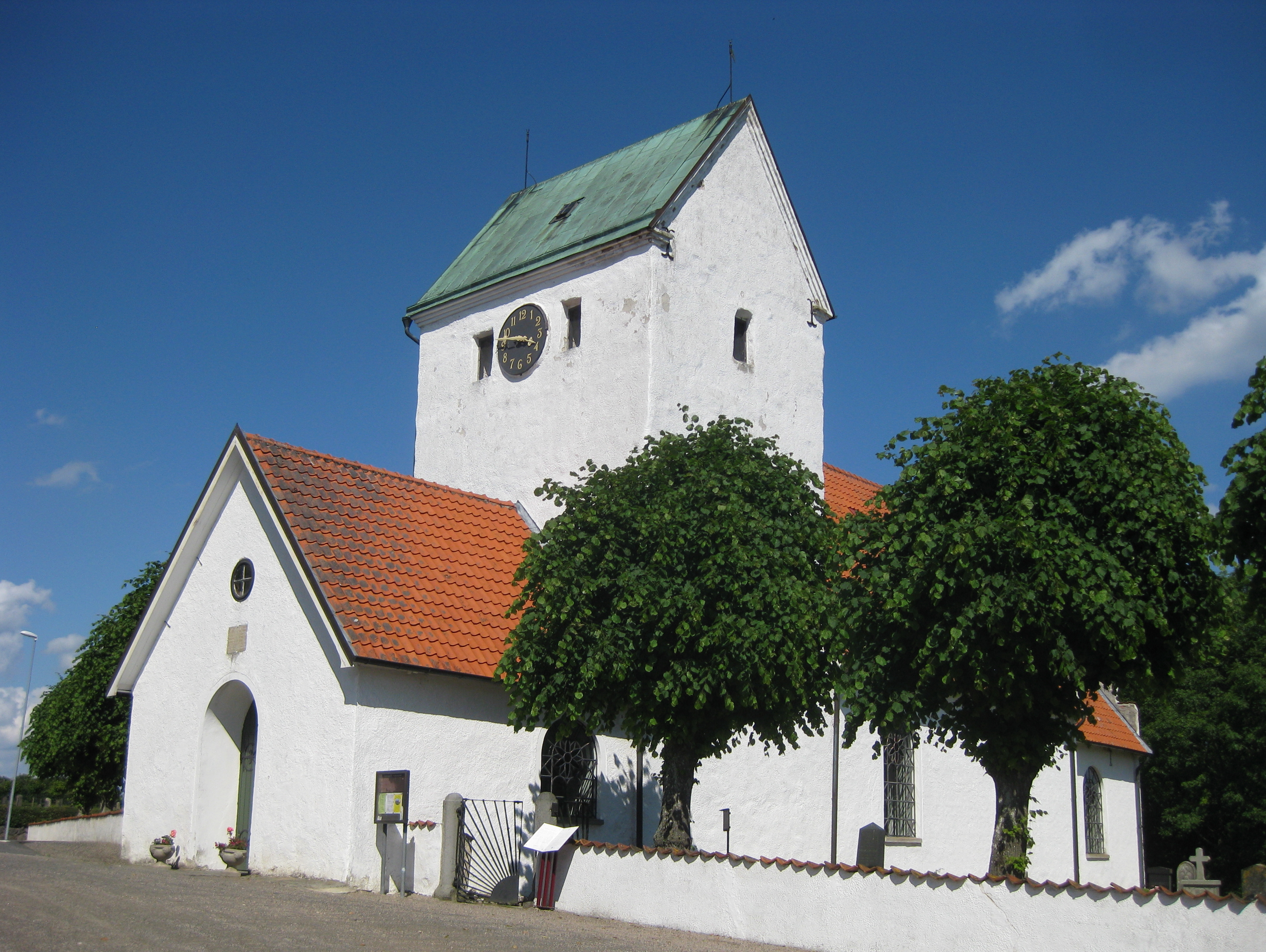
- Maglehem Church

- Location within Skåne Location within Sweden Location within Europe
- 55°46′22″N 14°09′11″E
- Country: Sweden
- Denomination: Church of Sweden

Maglehem Church (Swedish: Maglehems kyrka) is a medieval church in Maglehem (Kristianstad Municipality) in the province of Scania, Sweden. It dates from around 1250, and has been enlarged and rebuilt in stages. It contains remains of medieval murals of high quality, as well as several historic furnishings.

== History and architecture ==
The church in Maglehem was built around 1250. It is constructed of brick, and originally consisted of just the nave and a square chancel, with no apse. A tower, constructed of fieldstone, was added during the 14th century. During the 15th century the interior was remade, and groin vaults added in the nave.

Further additions were made after the Reformation. New vaults were constructed in the 17th century. A northern addition was built in 1760, and the church porch in front of the tower added in 1832. In 1883 the pentagonal apse was built.

== Murals and furnishings ==
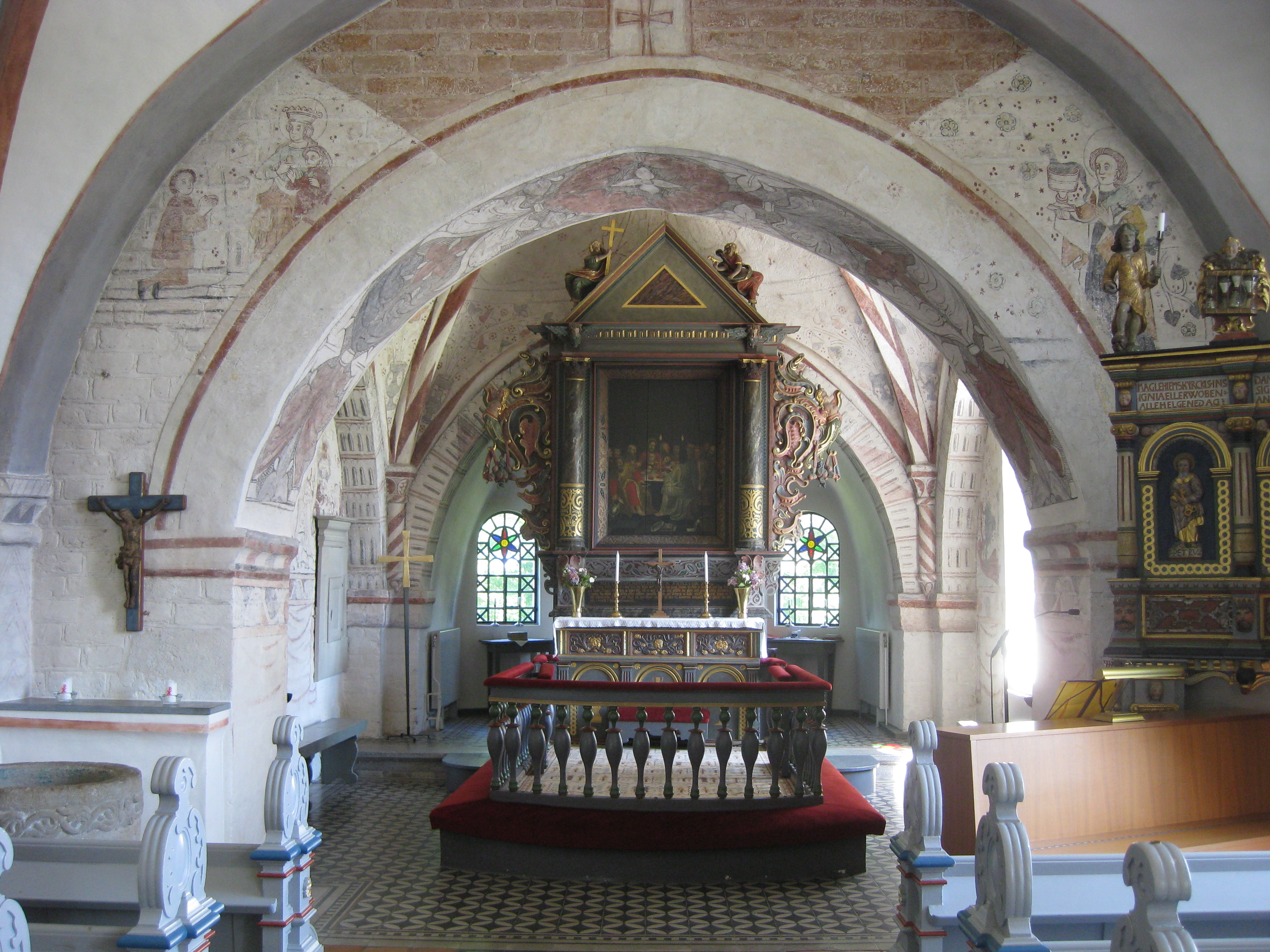
View towards the chancel, with parts of the pulpit, altarpiece and remains of medieval murals visible

The church contains remains of medieval murals of high quality. They remain in the chancel, and one of the walls of the nave. The murals are dated to the 1470s and depict religious scenes, including a depiction of the Last Judgment.

Among the furnishings, the decorated baptismal font is the oldest and dates from the construction period of the church. The rood cross is from the 15th century. Both the altarpiece and the pulpit are from the early 17th century and richly decorated. A church bell from 1330 is on display in the church porch.
