= Degeberga =

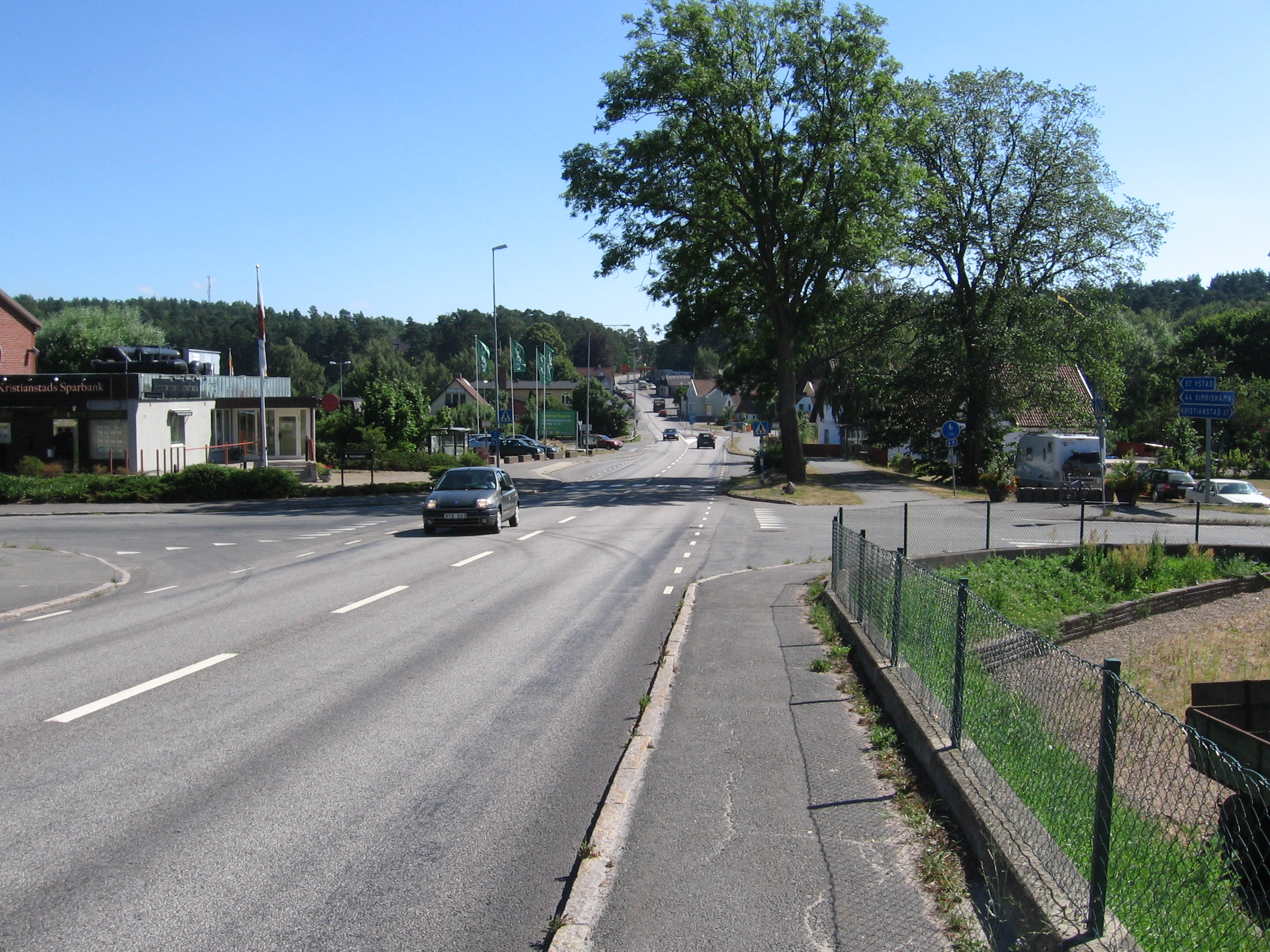
- Tingsvägen, the main road through Degeberga

- Location within Skåne Location within Sweden
- Coordinates: 55°50′N 14°05′E
- Country: Sweden
- Province: Skåne
- County: Skåne County
- Municipality: Kristianstad Municipality

Area
  - Total: 1.75 km^{2} (0.68 sq mi)

Population (31 December 2010)
  - Total: 1,291
  - Density: 739/km^{2} (1,910/sq mi)
- Time zone: UTC+1 (CET)
  - Summer (DST): UTC+2 (CEST)

Degeberga is a locality situated in Kristianstad Municipality, Skåne County, Sweden with 1,291 inhabitants in 2010. It is located approximately 22 km (14 mi) south of the city of Kristianstad. The area is known for the highest waterfall in Scania, located in the nearby Forsakar Nature Reserve.

An outdoor pool named Forsakarsbadet, which is open to visitors during the summer (between mid-June and mid-August), is situated in a valley just next to the nature reserve.

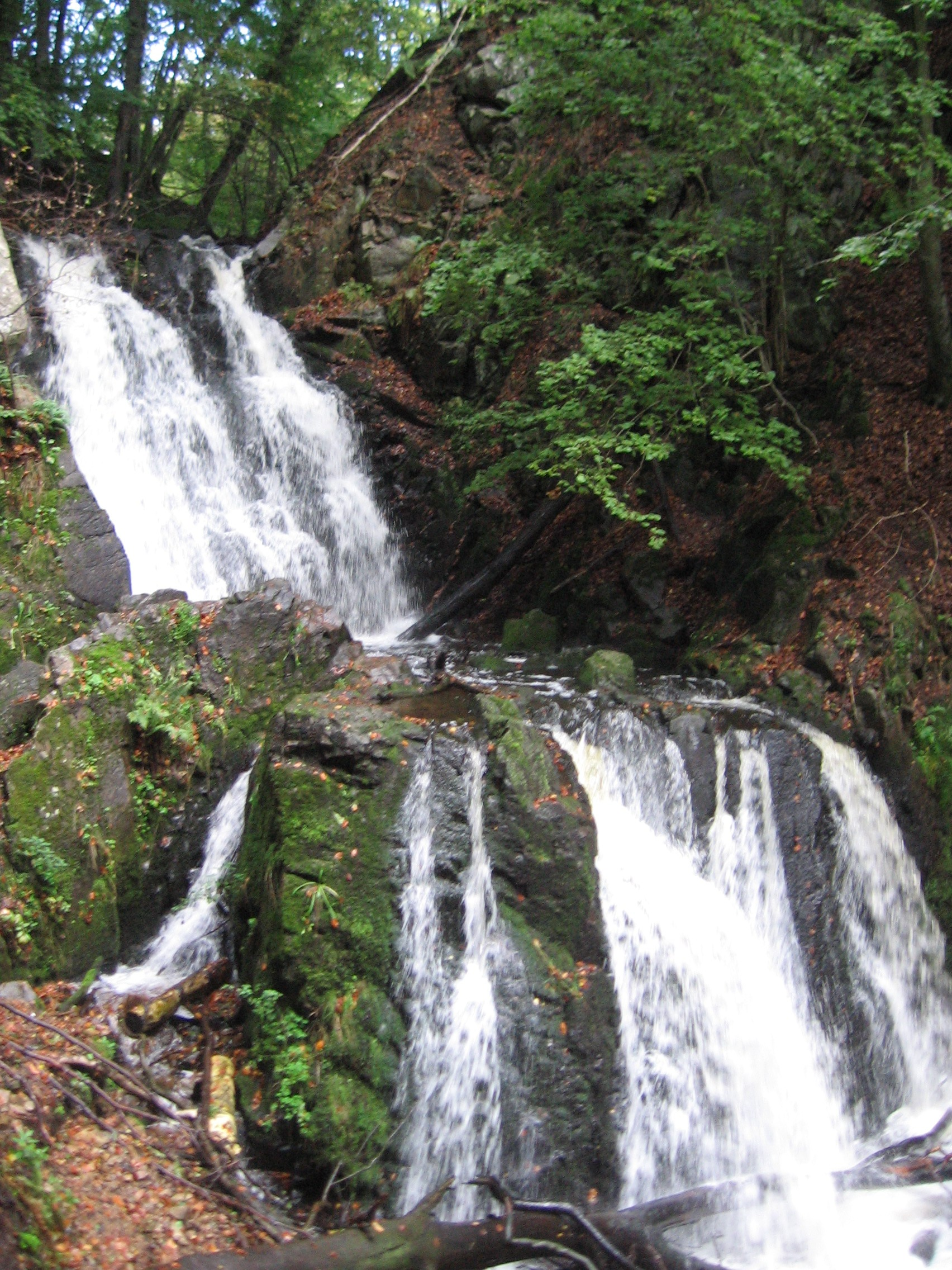
Forsakar waterfall
