= Ethel M. Elderton =

British mathematician (1878–1954)

- Born: 31 December 1878; Fulham, London, England
- Died: 5 May 1954 (aged 75); Hertfordshire, England
- Awards: Weldon Memorial Prize (1919)
- Scientific career
- Fields: Mathematics, genetics, eugenics
- Workplaces: Galton Eugenics Laboratory at University College London (renamed the Department of Human Genetics and Biometry in 1966)
- Academic advisors: Karl Pearson, Francis Galton, Alice Lee

Ethel Mary Elderton (1878–1954) was a British biometrician, statistician and eugenics researcher who worked with Francis Galton and Karl Pearson.

== Early life and education ==
Ethel Mary Elderton was born on 31 December 1878 in Fulham, London. Her father, William Alexander Elderton was a private tutor and her mother, Sarah Isabella, née Lapidge was school headmistress. The couple had eight children, of which Elderton was the third and the eldest girl. Her eldest brother was Sir William Palin Elderton, a statistician who worked as an actuary and became head of Equitable Life Assurance Society and also a friend of biostatistician Karl Pearson. Another brother, Thomas Howard Elderton was the president of the Calcutta Trust. Her father, William, and one of her younger brothers graduated with top of their classes mathematics degrees from Cambridge, becoming Cambridge Wranglers. Her exceptional mathematical abilities, stemming from family tradition, laid the foundation for her career.

Elderton was educated at Streatham High School before entering Bedford College in London in 1895 and studying under the Faculty of Arts program. There she was taught by Alice Lee, who employed by Professor Karl Pearson, a biostatistician and eugenecist. During her time at Bedford, Elderton became interested in the eugenics movement. After the death of her father, she left without completing her studies in 1899 and became a school teacher, which she continued to do until she resigned in 1905.

== Career ==
=== Galton Eugenics Laboratory ===
After her resignation from her teaching position in 1905, and recommended by fellow mathematician and former teacher at Bedford, Alice Lee, Elderton was first employed by English eugenicist Leonard Darwin, shortly followed by another eugenicist Francis Galton. In June 1905 she was appointed as Galton's part-time secretary at the Eugenics Record Office at University College London. Elderton showed a strong interest in the eugenics movement, Pearson recognized her enthusiasm and trained her in techniques of fingerprint data and family records, and in 1906 she was named a Galton Research Scholar. In 1907, the Eugenics Record Office was renamed the Galton Eugenics Laboratory under the guidance of Professor Karl Pearson.

Elderton then went on to become a full-time member of the laboratory, where her salary was only £100 per year in 1906. She gave up the offer with higher salary of the post of Secretary to a London College because she much preferred research work to executive work. She was promoted to Edgar Schuster's assistant, who was the first Galton Research Fellow. Later, Elderton was also named a Galton Research Fellow, a title she held for the rest of her career, and was named as one of the three chief assistants in the Galton Laboratory in 1907, along with David Heron and Amy Barrington.

Her work over the years in the Galton Eugenics Laboratory was known to have extremely impressed Francis Galton. He stated, "I cannot think of the Laboratory without Miss Elderton, she is the life and soul of the place" Previously, Galton had viewed women as intellectually inferior and unable to work in academia, but he was so amazed by Elderton's capabilities that she is credited for altering his opinions of women.

=== Eugenics Studies ===
As a eugenicist, Elderton's work focused on populations, and how physical characteristics and mental temperaments are inherited. Eugenicists of the early twentieth century believed that social issues stemmed from inheritable traits, which led to many, including Elderton to believe that social programs and reform were useless. Elderton's work was concentrated in three areas of interest:

1. "determining the relative importance of the contributions of heredity and environment to the fashioning of physical and mental characteristics in man".
2. "the measurement of resemblance between different sets of relatives"
3. "analyzing vital statistics of the British population."

Elderton's work during her time at the Galton Eugenics Laboratory focused on the inheritance of ability, where she observed and collected data on how much family relatives resembled each other. She was excellent at mathematical calculations needed for her work. Her advanced studies of alcoholism including her publication, A First Study of the Influence of Parental Alcoholism on the Physique and Ability of the Offspring (1910), drew her to the conclusion that people were at higher risk for alcoholism due to innate factors that were heritable. Her take on alcoholism was incredibly controversial at the time, and was criticized for correlating to her eugenic interpretations to her conclusions.

The decline in the birthrate was a great concern for Elderton. She saw women working in factories as a way that knowledge about contraceptives and preventing pregnancy spread. Elderton publication, Report on the English Birthrate, Part 1; England North of the Humber (1914) shared her hostile views on abortion, where she concluded that the declining birthrate was due to the increasing number of women seeking abortions in areas where women were employed in factories.

=== Other Work ===
In 1909 Elderton was named the Assistant Professor of Eugenics at University College London.

In a 1909 letter of Karl Pearson to Francis Galton, Pearson comments that Elderton is an excellent lecturer, and her upcoming lecturer "ought to be an interesting one as it will be the first attempt to give a quantitative comparison of Nature and Nurture." referring to her lecture titled, The Relative Strength of Nurture and Nature, (1909). Galton later comments on the same lecture praising her on how well-written it was.

Starting in 1917, Elderton was employed by the Anti-Aircraft Experimental Section (AAES), along with Pearson and his team of scientists, where she was very enthusiastic about her work. That summer, she did not take the traditional 12-week holiday, which Pearson rewarded her for by giving her extra pay. Elderton was the only member of Pearson's team continue working with him after transferring to work at the Ministry of Munitions.The two reportedly worked well together, authoring numerous publications together.

During WW1 in April 1918, almost all of the workers of Pearson's Biometric Laboratory went to work for the Admiralty (the UK armed forces) to help with the war effort. The only two who stayed were Elderton and Pearson.

Elderton provided financial backing for Pearson's Anthropometric Laboratory, which opened in 1924.

In 1925 she was appointed to an Assistant Professor in the Galton Eugenics Laboratory (renamed the Department of Human Genetics and Biometry in 1966) at University College London. In 1930, in a letter to Pearson, she wrote that her views her employment UCL to be "a most happy choice".

== Awards and later life ==
Elderton's work was recognized by the award of the Weldon Memorial Prize by the University of Oxford in 1919. This was awarded to the person who "in the ten years next preceding the date of the award, published the most noteworthy contribution to the development of mathematical or statistical methods applied to problems in Biology."

In December 1931 the University of London awarded Elderton the degree of Doctor of Science, and in the same year, she was promoted to a readership at University of London.

Elderton continued to work at the Galton Laboratory until she retired in 1933. In 1939 she was living at Yew Tree Cottage, Northchapel, Sussex. She never married and died on 5 May 1954 in Stanboroughs Hydro Nursing Home, Stanborough Park, Garston, Hertfordshire.

== Publications ==
=== Notable Publications ===
Primer of Statistics, Journal of the Royal Statistical Society, (1909), co-authored with William P Elderton

- Upon joining the Galton Laboratory, Elderton was guided and influenced by the eugenic objectives of Galton and Pearson. She held a firm belief that before seeking viable solutions to social problems, it was essential to provide solid statistical evidence. In 1907, Galton delivered the Herbert Spencer lecture, during which he outlined a proposal for a basic statistical textbook. Elderton and her brother William Palin Elderton, took up this suggestion and, leveraging their exceptional statistical skills, co-published Primer of Statistics which was officially published in 1909. The journal The Economic Bulletin reviewed the Primer of Statistics, stating that its presentation of the theory of statistics was well-written, understandable to people who do not have an advanced knowledge of higher mathematics, and would be a great resource for students.

A first study of the Influence of parental alcoholism on the physique and ability of the offspring, Eugenics Laboratory Memoir Series, (1910), co-authored with Karl Pearson

- One of Elderton's most well-known works, which claimed that alcoholism was inherited, which brought much backlash from other scientists and medical professionals. Many scientists of the day disagreed with this argument, reviews stated that Elderton and Pearson's approach put too much emphasis on inheritable characteristics rather than environmental variables. Shortly after, Elderton and Pearson published, A Second Study of the Influence of Parental Alcoholism on the Physique and Ability of the Offspring (1910) in response to the critiques, in which they only furthered the claims made in the first edition.

Report on the English Birthrate, Part I: England North of the Humber, Eugenics Laboratory Memoir Series, (1914)

- A broadly cited and influential paper. This study was also the first population study to report on abortions in England from the late nineteenth and early twentieth centuries. It includes statistics on abortion in Northern England, specific cases of how women induced abortions, and was the first report to strongly argue that abortion practices were causing the declining birthrate, leading to the founding of the social theory that the lowering birth rate was due to contraceptives. This paper gave eugenicists evidence to put the blame for the declining birthrate on women and their decisions to control their fertility. Elderton's conclusion reflects her beliefs that social reforms, believing they were not useful, an free handouts that would do more harm than good.

On the correlation of fertility with social value: a cooperative study, Eugenics Laboratory Memoir Series, (1913), co-authored with Amy Barrington, H. Gertrude Jones, Edith Mabel M. de G. Lamotte, Harold Joseph Laski, Karl Pearson.

- This publication sought to identify the relationship between wages—equated to social value—and family size at a certain age. Based on statistical data from various cities in the UK, the work attempted to demonstrate that individuals with greater social value tend to produce fewer offspring, a trend deemed detrimental to 'a healthier leading nation.' Furthermore, it advocated for the revision of social policies, with a particular focus on charitable welfare policies.

Following its founding in 1925, Elderton helped edit Pearson's journal, Annals of Eugenics. She often provided or edited eugenics articles to be included in the journal. Others who participated and regularly contributed to the journal were: Mary Noel Karm, Margaret Moul, Percy Stocks, and Geoffrey Morant. Over the years the field of eugenics received increasingly more criticism, so the journal was renamed the Annals of Human Genetics in 1954, which still exists today.

=== Lectures ===
Elderton delivered lectures on eugenics, which were compiled into the "Eugenics Laboratory Lecture Series" and published between 1909 and 1915. These lectures included The relative strength of nature and nurture (1909) and the relatively well-known On the Marriage of First Cousins (1911). In On the Marriage of First Cousins, her research for this publication encompassed over 2000 cases, and both the publication and the corresponding lectures were appreciated by her laboratory colleagues and Galton himself. The work, exploring the studies of the marriage of first cousins through various academic perspectives—historical, moral, and eventually eugenics. This research gained support from other women in the laboratory, including Amy Barrington, Kathleen T. Ryley, H. Gertrude Jones, Julia Bell, and Eveline Y. Thompson.

=== List of Ethel Elderton's Publications ===
1. The Inheritance of Physical Characters, Biometrika, (1907), co-authored with Edgar Schuster
2. The Inheritance of Ability, Eugenics Laboratory Memoir Series, (1907), co-authored with Edgar Schuster
3. On the Measure of the Resemblance of First Cousins, Eugenics Laboratory Memoir Series, (1907), co-authored with Karl Pearson
4. A second study on the statistics of pulmonary tuberculosis: marital infection, Cambridge University Press, (1908), co-authored with E G Pope and Karl Pearson
5. On the Association of Drawing with Other Capacities in School Children, Biometrika, (1909)
6. The Relative Strength of Nurture and Nature, Eugenics Laboratory Lecture Series, (1909)
7. On the Marriage of First Cousins, Eugenics Laboratory Lecture Series, (1909)
8. Primer of Statistics, Journal of the Royal Statistical Society, (1909), co-authored with William P Elderton
9. The Influence of Parental Occupation and Home Conditions on the Physique of the Offspring, (1909), Eugenics Laboratory Memoir Series (unpublished)
10. On the Correlation of Death-Rates, Journal of the Royal Statistical Society, (1910), co authored with Karl Pearson and Alice Lee
11. A first study of the Influence of parental alcoholism on the physique and ability of the offspring, Eugenics Laboratory Memoir Series, (1910), co-authored with Karl Pearson
12. A second study of the influence of parental alcoholism on the physique and ability of the offspring, Eugenics Laboratory Memoir Series, (1910), co-authored with Karl Pearson
13. On the Relation of Stature and Weight to Pigmentation, Biometrika, (1912)
14. On the Hereditary Character of General Health, Biometrika, (1913), co-authored with Karl Pearson
15. On the Correlation of Fertility with Social Value. A Co-Operative Study, Eugenics Laboratory Memoir Series, (1913), Co-authored with Amy Barrington, G H Jones, E M M de G Lamotte, H J Laski, and K Pearson
16. Note on Infantile Mortality and Employment of Women, Biometrika, (1914)
17. Height and Weight of School Children in Glasgow, Biometrika, (1914)
18. Report on the English Birthrate, Part I: England North of the Humber, Eugenics Laboratory Memoir Series, (1914)
19. Further Evidence of Natural Selection in Man, Biometrika, (1915), co-authored with Karl Pearson
20. The Influence of Isolation in the Diphtheria Attack- and Death-Rates, Biometrika, (1915) co-authored with Karl Pearson
21. On the torsion resulting from flexure in prisms with cross-sections of uni-axial symmetry only, Cambridge University Press, (1918), co-authored with A W Young and Karl Pearson
22. On the Nest and Eggs of the Common Tern (S Fluviatilis), A Cooperative Study, Biometrika, (1919), co-authored with W Rowan, E Wolff, P L Sulman, K Pearson, E Isaacs, and M Tildesley
23. Life-History Albums, Biometrika, (1919)
24. On the Inheritance of the Finger-Print, Biometrika, (1920)
25. On the Variate Difference Method, Biometrika, (1923), co-authored with Karl Pearson
26. A Summary of the Present Position with Regard to the Inheritance of Intelligence, Biometrika, (1923)
27. Correlation Between Prognosis Based on Condition of the Tuberculous Patient at Entry to a Sanatorium and the Issue, Annals of Human Genetics, (1927), co-authored with B Perott
28. On the Growth Curves of Certain Characters in Women and the Interrelationship of these Characters, Annals of Human Genetics, (1928), co-authored with Margaret Moul
29. On the Relative Value of the Factors with Influence Infant Welfare, Eugenics Laboratory Memoir Series, (1928)
30. On the Distribution of the First Product Moment-Coefficient in Samples Drawn from a Indefinitely Large Norman Population, Biometrika, (1929), co-authored with Karl Pearson and G B Jeffery
31. Note on Variability in Girls and Boys (Glasgow) for Height and Weight, Biometrika, (1929)
32. Table of the Values of the Differences of the Powers of Zero, Biometrika, (1931), co-authored with Margaret Moul
33. The Mean and Second Moment Coefficient of the Multiple Correlation Coefficient, in Samples from a Normal Population, Biometrika, (1931), authored by J Wishart. E Elderton and T Kondo credited with an Appendix
34. On the Normality or Want of Normality in the Frequency Distributions of Cranial Measurements, Biometrika, (1932), co-authored with T L Woo
35. The Lanarkshire Milk Experiment, Annals of Human Genetics, (1933)
36. Strength of Vision in Relation to Eye and Hair Pigmentation, Biometrika, (1935), co-authored with Catherine M Thompson
