= Julia Bell (geneticist) =

British geneticist (1879–1979)

- Born: 28 January 1879; Sherwood, Nottinghamshire, England
- Died: 26 April 1979 (aged 100); London, England
- Education: Girton College, Cambridge; Trinity College, Dublin; London School of Medicine for Women; London School of Medicine for Women (Royal Free Hospital)
- Known for: Statistical investigations of the inheritance of anomalies and diseases
- Awards: Weldon Memorial Prize (1941)
- Scientific career
- Fields: Genetics eugenics
- Workplaces: University College London, Medical Research Council
- Academic advisors: Karl Pearson

Julia Bell, FRCP (28 January 1879 – 26 April 1979) was an English physician and scholar of eugenics and human genetics. Her early career as a statistical assistant to Karl Pearson (1857–1936) marked the beginning of a lifelong professional association with the Galton Laboratory for National Eugenics (renamed the Department of Human Genetics and Biometry in 1966) at University College London. Bell's work as a human geneticist was based on her statistical investigations into the inheritance of anomalies and diseases of the eye, nervous diseases, muscular dystrophies, and digital anomalies.

== Biography ==
Julia Bell attended Girton College in Cambridge and took the Mathematical Tripos exam in 1901. Because women could not officially receive degrees from Oxford or Cambridge, she was awarded a master's degree at Trinity College, Dublin for her work investigating solar parallax at Cambridge Observatory.

In 1908, Julia Bell contributed to the early development of human genetics through work at Galton Laboratory. She was involved in documenting inherited diseases in human populations. She focused her research on identifying and discovering the patterns of hereditary conditions to support the early work of clinical genetics as scientific discipline in Britain. Her work reflected a major shift toward more systematic and medically designed approached in human genetics. She started work at University College London as assistant to Karl Pearson (1857–1936), professor of applied mathematics, director of the Galton Laboratory for National Eugenics at University College, London and one of the founders of modern statistics. Bell's predecessor as assistant to Karl Pearson was the mathematician Alice Lee who had resigned due to ill-health.

At the Galton Laboratory, Julia Bell worked at one of the primary centers for early human genetic research in Britain. The laboratory had a large influence on the development of biometric and hereditary studies which was building on the work of Francis Galton. She contributed to connecting clinical observations with early genetic frameworks.

Bell's position as Assistant to Karl Pearson was funded by Francis Galton's endowment to University College London to support eugenics research. Pearson described the role of his Assistant as "a post well suited to a woman living with her family in London and keen on scientific work" because the Assistant's salary of £100 a year was unattractive to men compared with the annual salary of £250 year paid for the position of Galton Laboratory Research Fellow. Bell's remuneration for her work as Pearson's assistant was equivalent to the pay of a non-academic part-time clerk at this time. Like other women scientists of the period, Bell's early professional life throughout the 1920s was defined by low pay and short-term research contracts. In 1921, Bell was awarded a Fellowship worth £300 p.a. by the Medical Research Council.

In 1914, Karl Pearson had asked Bell to augment the expertise of the Galton Laboratory staff by taking a degree in medicine. Bell's decision to train as a doctor was informed by her own interest in the more observational aspects of the study of heredity. She studied at the London School of Medicine for Women (Royal Free Hospital) which had been the first medical school in Britain to admit women, and the only school to do so until 1886. In the years prior to the outbreak of the First World War, Bell was the only staff member of the Galton Lab who was medically qualified. Bell qualified MRCS LRCP in 1920, was awarded membership of the Royal College of Physicians and made Galton research fellow under the Medical Research Council in 1926, and was elected Fellow of the Royal College of Physicians in 1938, being only the fourth woman to be so elected.

Between 1907 and 1925, Bell was employed intermittently in both the Biometric and Galton Laboratories, both of which sat within the Department of Applied Statistics at UCL under the directorshop of Karl Pearson. At the time of Pearson's retirement in 1933, Bell was one of five long-term members of staff who had been in place since 1922, along with Ethel Elderton, Percy Stocks, and Egon Pearson. In 1932, Bell had joined the genetics committee of the Medical Research Council and worked as a permanent member of the scientific staff of the Medical Research Council 1933-1944. Her subsequent work led to her receiving the Weldon memorial prize and medal for biometry awarded by Oxford University in 1941. Bell worked within the Galton Laboratory for 57 years, working there from 1908 until her retirement in 1965 at age 86.

== Publications ==
Bell's early output at the Galton Laboratory included co-authoring "A Statistical Study of Oral Temperatures in School Children with Special Reference to Parental, Environmental and Class Differences" in 1914. The other authors were Mary Hamilton Williams and Karl Pearson. The study compared the temperatures of 4,654 children at different schools in Worcestershire, England, to determine whether conditions like rheumatism and phthisis were hereditary. They concluded that "there is a real and marked difference in temperature between the children of the higher and lower social classes," a difference that they argued was due to poverty and to some extent heredity rather than "home environment" or "nourishment". They continue: "The poor are largely poor because of their defective physique, and the segregation of those with defective physique cannot be obviated, as long as the birth-rate is not directly determined by the physique of the parents."

In 1917 and 1919, Bell published a multi-part series titled A study of the long bones of the English skeleton Part I, Part I: Section II, co-authored with Karl Pearson. Other women working at the Galton Laboratory who contributed to this work included: Assistant E. Augusta Jones (formerly Secretary to Francis Galton), Assistant and mathematician Eleanor Pairman, Assistant Mary Seeger, microscopist Marion Radford, Eva Bramley Moore, mathematician Alice Lee, and Assistant Eveline Y. Thomson. The work was part-funded by a donation from Gertrude H. Jones, a former Secretary to the Galton Laboratory. Pearson and Bell's analysis of the skeletal remains of different human populations and primates sought to identify "racial differences in man", informed by the pseudo-science of eugenics originally formulated by Francis Galton whose bequest had funded the Galton Laboratory.

Working as a member of the permanent staff of the Medical Research Council at the Galton Laboratory (renamed the Department of Human Genetics and Biometry in 1966), Julia Bell went on to do pioneering work in documenting the familial nature of many diseases.

Bell wrote most of the sections in the unique series The Treasury of Human Inheritance published by the Galton Laboratory between 1909 and 1956. She was sole or lead author for all sections of Volume II: Nettleship Memorial Volume on Anomalies and Diseases of the Eye (1933), Volume IV: Nervous Diseases and Muscular Dystrophies (1948), and Volume V: On Hereditary Digital Anomalies (1951–58). Bell's "combination of mathematical training, genetic knowledge and clinical expertise yielded numerous important insights into human inheritance first appearing in the Treasury," Harper noted. Julia Bell's Treasury of Human Inheritance "remains a valuable scientific as well as an historical record of the genetics of a range of important inherited disorders."

Julia Bell contributed to The Treasury of Human Inheritance which was an early publication in human genetics. The project was meant to document and classify hereditary disorders through detailed case studies and familial histories. She was involved in organizing and compiling clinical data to help establish more regulated descriptions of genetic conditions. The publication became a reference for physicians and researchers in the field of genetics.

In 1937, Julia Bell published a landmark article with J. B. S. Haldane which reported a linkage between the genes for colourblindness and haemophilia on the X chromosome. This discovery was a key step toward the mapping of the human genome.

In 1943, Bell co-authored with James Purdon Martin a paper on the link between a form of intellectual disability in children and the X-chromosomes of the parents, with the condition subsequently being named Martin–Bell syndrome. It is now known as fragile X syndrome.

Julia Bell's 1951 work 'On Brachydactyly and Symphalangism' in Volume V: On Hereditary Digital Anomalies (1951–58) for The Treasury of Human Inheritance series was foundational for later research into the medical syndrome brachydactyly.

Julia Bell kept working actively for many years. Her work contributed to the early development of clinical genetics by combining medical observation with hereditary analysis. Her research helped shape approaches to understand patterns of inherited diseases as they later became central to modern genetics. With her documentation and organization of genetic disorders, she contributed to the shift of human genetics to a more clinical science. At age 82 and still working for the Galton Laboratory, she published "On rubella in pregnancy" in The British Medical Journal. She retired at age 86; she kept in touch with genetics until her death at the age of 100.

== Legacy ==
Julia Bell's contributions are recognized in the history of human and medical genetics. Her work on classifying hereditary diseases and contribution in early genetic publications helped shape the way others approach genetic disorders. Her contributions are relevant to understanding the development of modern genetics and medical classification systems.
