= Elderton (surname) =

Elderton is a surname. Notable people with the surname include:

- Ethel M. Elderton (1878–1954), English statistician
- Merrick Elderton (1884–1939), English cricketer and educator
- William Elderton (ballad writer) (died c. 1592), English actor, lawyer, and ballad-writer
- William Palin Elderton (1877–1962), English actuary and statistician, brother of Ethel
