= Eleanor Pairman =

Scottish mathematician

Eleanor Pairman Brown
- Born: 8 June 1896; Broomieknowe, Lasswade, Scotland
- Died: 14 September 1973 (aged 77); White River Junction, Vermont
- Education: University of Edinburgh; University College London; Radcliffe College
- Scientific career
- Workplaces: Dartmouth College
- Thesis: Expansion Theorems for Solution of a Fredholm's Linear Homogeneous Integral Equation of the Second Kind with Kernel of Special Non-Symmetric Type (1922)
- Academic advisors: Karl Pearson; George David Birkhoff

Eleanor "Nora" Pairman, also known as Nora Brown, (8 June 1896 – 14 September 1973) was a Scottish mathematician and only the third woman to receive a doctorate in math from Radcliffe College in Massachusetts. Later in life she developed novel methods to teach mathematics to blind students.

== Biography ==
Pairman was born the youngest of four in Broomieknowe, Lasswade in Scotland to Helen and John Pairman who was solicitor of the Supreme Courts of Scotland. Her father died when she was very young.

She attended Lasswade Higher Grade School (1903–1908) before going to George Watson's Ladies' College (1908–1914). After finishing her Scottish Leaving Certificate examinations in 1914, she started studying mathematics at the University of Edinburgh.

== Career ==
Eleanor Pairman graduated with an MA in 1917 with first class honors in mathematics and natural philosophy, after which she was awarded a three-year Vans Dunlop scholarship which permitted her to continue her studies at any university. Pairman read two papers at meetings of the Edinburgh Mathematical Society early in 1918.

In 1918 Pairman joined the staff of Karl Pearson's Department of Applied Statistics, which comprised the Biometric Laboratory and Francis Galton Laboratory for National Eugenics, at University College London. Pairman's role in the Galton Laboratory was that of a human computer. She was referenced as one of a number of women contributors in the 1917 Galton Laboratory publication A study of the long bones of the English skeleton Part I, co-authored by Julia Bell and Karl Pearson and which sought to identify "racial differences in man".

In 1919, Pairman co-authored with Karl Pearson the paper "On Corrections for the Moment-Coefficients of Limited Range Frequency Distributions When there are Finite or Infinite Ordinates and Any Slopes at the Terminals of the Range" published in the journal Biometrika.

One of her instructors, Cargill G. Knott, wrote a letter of recommendation saying: "With fitting opportunity she has every promise of a distinguished and useful career." Pairman arrived in New York on 12 October 1919 and went on to Cambridge, Massachusetts to study at Radcliffe College, an all-women's college closely associated with the all-male Harvard College. There she studied under George David Birkhoff. Her thesis was titled 'Expansion Theorems for Solution of a Fredholm's Linear Homogeneous Integral Equation of the Second Kind with Kernel of Special Non-Symmetric Type' and was awarded a PhD in 1922. When she received her doctorate she was only the third woman to be awarded a PhD in mathematics from Radcliffe College. In that same year she married a fellow grad student, Bancroft Brown.

The couple moved to Hanover, N.H. in 1922 so Bancroft could assume a teaching position at Dartmouth College, which, at the time, was a men's school with an all-male faculty but occasionally admitting women as graduate students. Later, Pairman published a joint paper with Rudolph E. Langer in 1927.

Much later, Pairman taught math part-time at Dartmouth, from September 1955 until June 1959.

== Teaching math in Braille ==
About 1950, Pairman started focusing on teaching mathematics to blind students, learning Braille and learning how to make diagrams using her sewing machine and other household items. Her daughter Margaret later wrote, “Geometry was a particular problem, because you really need diagrams. Braille is done on paper like thin cardstock. So she rounded up all kinds of household implements like pinking shears and pastry wheels and such and created diagrams that could be felt with the fingers, like the Braille symbols. Apparently nobody had ever done this before."

Pairman's son-in-law Thomas Streeter wrote about a visit to Hanover, when he was shown some of her work. “A graduate student at Harvard was blind and needed a particular book put into Braille, and it was full of mathematical symbols. What to do? The sewing machine, of course. She had written down the math and had it beside the machine. She put a piece of Braille paper under the foot and proceeded to reproduce the symbols by guiding the paper under the needle. It had to be the mirror image of what she had written."

In about 1959, the Hanover Gazette published an article about her saying that Pairman was in the process of transcribing two mathematical texts, one was for a freshman student at Boston College, and another, a reference book on group theory, destined for a post-graduate course at Columbia University in New York. The article went on to say that she was in regular discussions with Dartmouth math freshmen three hours each week and that apparently, by the end of the spring term, she had taken over the course instruction.

Pairman's daughter Margaret wrote later: “For all the satisfaction that she got from these [Braille] projects, the only time I saw her truly happy was when she was teaching. And she had precious little opportunity to do that, being obviously ahead of her time and also stuck in a males-only college community and in a world where it was well-nigh impossible for married ladies to function professionally.”

== Personal life ==
On 10 August 1922, Pairman married Bancroft Huntington Brown (1894-1974) at Roselea, the Pairman home in Broomieknowe, Scotland and afterwards assumed the name Eleanor P. Brown, becoming widely known as Nora Brown. Her husband was a Harvard graduate student who had also received his PhD in 1922. Together, they had four children, John Pairman (b. 1923), Barbara (1925-1979), Joanna (1935-1935), and Margaret Wylde (b. 1937). Two of her three surviving children (Joanna died as a baby) went on to earn doctorates of their own.

Pairman died after a long battle with breast cancer on 14 September 1973, at the age of 77, in White River Junction, Vermont. She was survived by her husband, two sisters, three children, seven grandchildren, and one great-granddaughter. Her husband died the following year.

== Selected publications ==
Pairman authored or co-authored several peer-reviewed papers during her career, including:

- Pairman, Eleanor (1917). "On a Difference Equation due to Stirling". Proceedings of the Edinburgh Mathematical Society. 36: 40–60. doi:10.1017/S0013091500035227. ISSN 1464-3839.
- Pairman, Eleanor. (1919). Tables of the digamma and trigamma functions. Cambridge University Press. OCLC 681090033.
- Pairman, Eleanor; Pearson, Karl (1919). "On corrections for the moment-coefficients of limited range frequency distributions when there are finite or infinite ordinates and any slopes at the terminals of the range". Biometrika. 12 (3–4): 231–258. doi:10.1093/biomet/12.3-4.231. ISSN 0006-3444.
- Langer, Rudolph E.; Brown, Eleanor P. (1927). "On a Class of Integral Equations with Discontinuous Kernels". Transactions of the American Mathematical Society. 29 (4): 683–715. doi:10.2307/1989199. ISSN 0002-9947. JSTOR 1989199.
