= Galton Laboratory =

British eugenics laboratory

Coordinates: 51.523°N 0.133°W

The Galton Laboratory
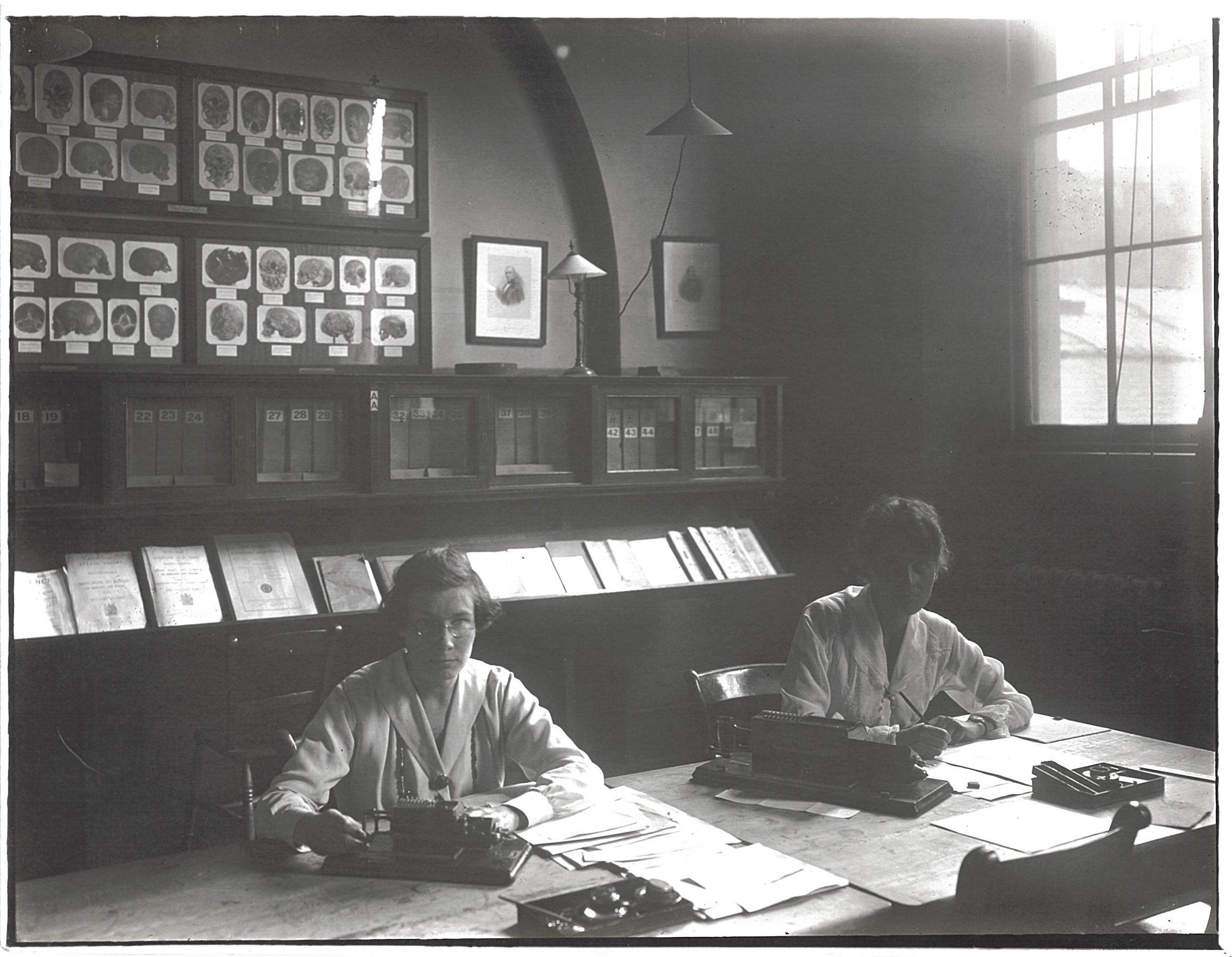
- Two unidentified women sat at a large table with computing machines in the Galton Laboratory.
- Established: 1911–2013
- Laboratory type: British Eugenics Laboratory
- Field of research: Eugenics; Biometry; Statistics
- Directors: Karl Pearson, 1911–1933; R. A. Fisher, 1934–1943; Lionel Penrose, 1945–1965
- Staff: Ethel Elderton; Amy Barrington; David Heron; Julia Bell; Alice Lee; Adelaide Gladys Davin; Mary Noel Karn; Mary Hamilton Williams; Dr. Eleanor Pairman
- Location: Bloomsbury, London, England
- Affiliations: University College London

The Galton Laboratory of National Eugenics was a laboratory established for the research of eugenics, later for the study of biometry and statistics, and eventually human genetics, based at University College London (UCL) in London, England. It reflected Francis Galton's focus on quantitative analysis that led to the study of statistical heredity and eugenics. In the early 1900s, biometricians such as Karl Pearson and Mendelians like William Bateson were inspired by his work. In 1904, he launched his eugenics campaign at the Sociological Society, founded by Patrick Geddes and others. This was a step towards making eugenics a national social scientific program. The laboratory existed in name until 2020.

== History ==
=== The Eugenics Record Office ===
Galton's Record of Family Faculties of 1884 and Anthropometric Laboratory at the International Health Exhibition from 1884 to 1885 were the data-gathering systems that led to the establishment of the Eugenics Record Office. These systems were a way for Galton to apply statistical methods to humans. Individuals paid threepence to have their weight, height, reaction time and other traits scientifically measured by a superintendent. Galton kept the anonymous copy of the scorecard for research that participants left with. Overall, 9,337 people were measured during the initial exhibition, followed by 3,678 more sets of data after moving the lab several times.

The Eugenics Record Office, a precursor to the Galton Laboratory, was established in 1904 by Francis Galton. Galton coined the term eugenics and influenced 20th century biologists. In 1906 Karl Pearson took directorship of The Eugenics Record Office, eventually dissolving it. During its operation, The Eugenics Record Office employed three staffers: Dr. Edgar Schuster (Galton Research Fellow, 1905–1906), David Heron (Galton Research Fellow, 1906), and Ethel Elderton (Research Assistant and Secretary, 1905–1907). Historians often overlook the social motivations behind his eugenics programme and instead, focus on his scientific work. In 1907 the Office was reconstituted as the Galton Eugenics Laboratory as part of UCL, still under the direction of Karl Pearson, a professor of Applied mathematics.

=== The Department of Applied Statistics and Eugenics ===
The Galton Laboratory was created and financed by Francis Galton, a profoundly influential yet deeply controversial figure in statistics and British science. On his death in 1911, Francis Galton left his estate to the University of London to fund a permanent Chair of Eugenics. This decision was the culmination of his life's primary passion: eugenics. Galton believed that humanity could be improved through selective breeding, and his writing often spoke of racist judgements, assuming a natural superiority of the Anglo-Saxon race. The chair he funded was first filled by Karl Pearson. Pearson created the Department of Applied Statistics, which combined the Biometric Laboratory and the Francis Galton Laboratory for National Eugenics, and in 1913, this department was renamed the Department of Applied Statistics and Eugenics.

The department's increase in size prompted UCL to acquire or construct a new space. In 1912, Sir Herbert Bartlett offered space in the North-West front of UCL's Wilkins building. The outbreak of the First World War interrupted work, and the new space was not used by the department until October 1919, with an official opening in June 1920.

Pearson was succeeded as Galton Professor by R. A. Fisher in 1934. When Fisher moved to Cambridge in 1944, the laboratory was incorporated into an enlarged Department of Eugenics, Biometry and Genetics headed by J. B. S. Haldane, the Wheldon Professor of Biometry. This reversed a previous split in 1933 following Karl Pearson's retirement.

=== The Department of Human Genetics and Biometry ===
The Galton Laboratory underwent many changes during the post-war period. Most notably, this period saw another renaming of the department, a direct response to the profoundly negative associations of eugenics after World War II. This move was part of a much larger, ongoing changing of Galton's legacy that continues today. It reflects a central dilemma: removing his name may risk forgetting the past, but keeping it may appear to glorify a painful ideology. This debate is captured in the nuanced views of modern academic leaders; for instance, the president of the Royal Statistical Society cautioned against a "blanket condemnation", arguing that Galton's statistical methods should not be linked to his views on eugenics. In this complex climate, UCL has launched an inquiry into its history with the eugenics movement and has curated exhibitions designed to display Galton's research while encouraging viewers to question the racist assumptions behind it. It was amidst this re-evaluation that Harry Harris formally changed the name in 1966, where it then became the Department of Human Genetics and Biometry.

The Department of Human Genetics and Biometry, including the Galton Laboratory, became part of the Department of Biology at UCL in 1996. The MRC Human Biochemical Genetics Unit was established by Harris in 1962. He was Honorary Director until he went to Philadelphia in 1976, and the unit continued under the direction of David Hopkinson until its closure in October 2000. Sam Berry also held a Professorship in Genetics from 1972.

In 1967, the laboratory moved into a dedicated new building, Wolfson House, along with a further two Medical Research Council units: the Human Biochemical Genetics Unit, headed by Harris, and the MRC Experimental Genetics Unit, headed by Hans Grüneberg. Subsequently, on Grüneberg's retirement, the space occupied by his unit was reallocated to the newly created MRC Mammalian Development Unit, led by Anne McLaren, and the MRC Blood Group Unit, headed by Ruth Sanger, and subsequently Patricia Tippett.

In 2013, the Galton Laboratory was incorporated into UCL's then-new Department of Genetics, Evolution, and Environment.

Under the leadership of Lionel Penrose and later Harry Harris, the Galton Laboratory became internationally recognized for its contributions to medical and population genetics. Research expanded into chromosomal disorders, biochemical genetics, and statistical methods for genetic analysis. The laboratory's scientists contributed to early work on Down syndrome, X-linked conditions, and the use of enzyme polymorphisms as genetic markers. These efforts positioned the Galton Laboratory as one of the leading genetics research center's in Europe during the mid-20th century.

== The Galton Laboratory and its Legacy at UCL ==
In 2018, then President and Provost of UCL, Professor Michael Arthur established a formal inquiry into the history of eugenics at UCL. The Inquiry was chaired by Professor Iyiola Solanke, of the University of Leeds and included sixteen members. The original inquiry set out six terms of reference that investigated the teaching, financial benefit and linkage of eugenics to modern discrimination.

In June 2020, UCL issued a formal apology for its history and legacy of eugenics. This followed a report and comprehensive set of recommendations given to UCL in February 2020 from its official Inquiry into the History of Eugenics. Additionally, UCL announced that the institution would be renaming spaces and buildings named after Francis Galton and Karl Pearson. The spaces included the former Galton Lecture Theatre, the Pearson Lecture Theatre, and the Pearson Building of which were renamed Lecture Theatre 115, Lecture Theatre G22, and the North-West Wing, respectively. Nine of the inquiry's original sixteen members did not agree to sign this report.

The MORE Group recommendations was an additional report compiled by nine of the inquiry's members who did not agree to sign off on the Feb 2020 report. Reasons cited by members of the MORE Group for their refusal to sign the Feb 2020 report included a need for more time to develop the narrative of the report, a deeper understanding of UCL's eugenics history and a broader set of terms that gave equal weight and understanding to all targets of eugenics.

The inquiry group published one additional group report in April 2021 co-chaired by Professor Hazel Genn and Dr. Kamna Patel. This report synthesized the original February 2020 report with further recommendations of the MORE Group. This report included the redistribution of Galton-related funds, greater representation of BAME (Black, Asian, and Minority Ethnic) and disabled communities, as well as long-term educational and institutional reform towards transparency and inclusion. The most recent report was released in November 2021 focused on further research undertaken by the inquiry.

== Women in the Galton Laboratory ==
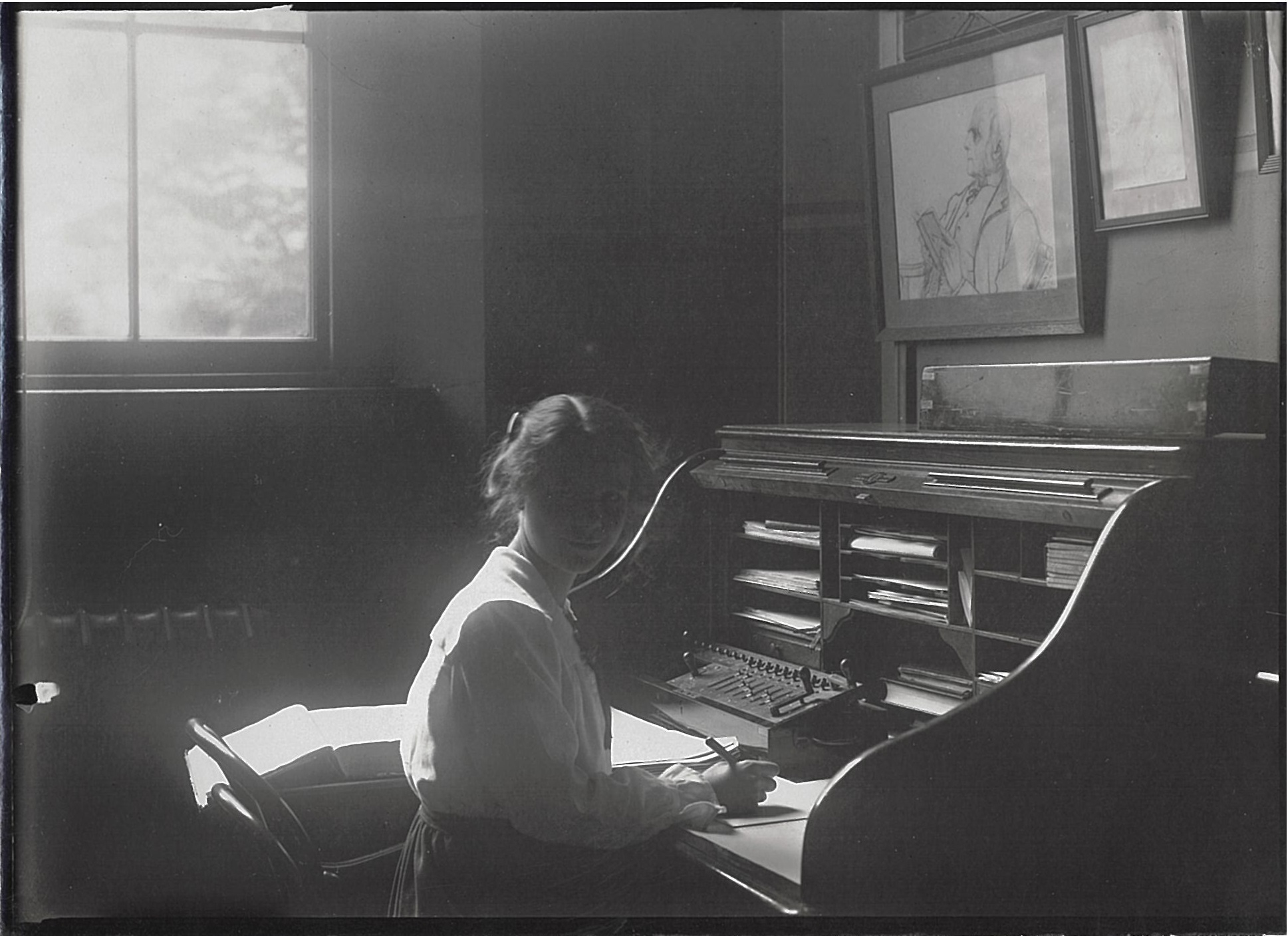
An unidentified woman sat at a desk with a computing machine. A framed drawing of Francis Galton hangs on the wall above the desk.

Women made significant contributions to the scientific work of the Galton Laboratory through roles in data collection, computation, and research during the early 20th century. Mathematicians and "computers" including Alice Lee, Cicely Fawcett and Amy Barrington assisted Karl Pearson and his colleagues by performing detailed statistical and biometric calculations that supported the laboratory's studies on eugenics. Alice Lee earned her BSc from London University in 1884, the first student from Bedford College to do so. She then worked as a physics and mathematics assistant teacher, around the time she was acquainted with Karl Pearson. By 1895, she was attending his lectures at UCL and developed a strong interest in his biometric research. Her subsequent work focused on examining skull capacity differences between men and women and its correlation with intellectual capability. When she concluded there was no correlation and shared her findings with Galton, he expressed disappointment with her conclusion, stating that he disagrees with her results.

Some women including Ethel Elderton, were committed to the lab's ideas on eugenics while others participated primarily to gain experience in scientific or artistic fields. Mary Kirby, for instance, trained at the Slade School of Fine Art before joining the lab as a draughtswoman, producing scientific illustrations before becoming a university arts lecturer.

Despite their essential contributions, women at the Galton laboratory worked under unequal conditions, receiving lower pay and limited recognition when compared to their male counterparts. Many began as unpaid volunteers or assistants, later securing modestly paid positions including research assistants, draughtswomen or secretaries. Nonetheless, several women, including Julia Bell, who became a pioneer in the field of genetics found success within the work at the Galton Laboratory.

Recent archival studies have documented the significant roles women played in the Galton Laboratory's research, particularly in statistical data and the development of modern genetics. Their experiences reflect both the professional opportunities available to women at the time and the institutional limitations that determined their participation in scientific research.

== Publications ==
The Galton Laboratory published many pieces including memoir series, lectures series, addresses, biometric series, and technical series.

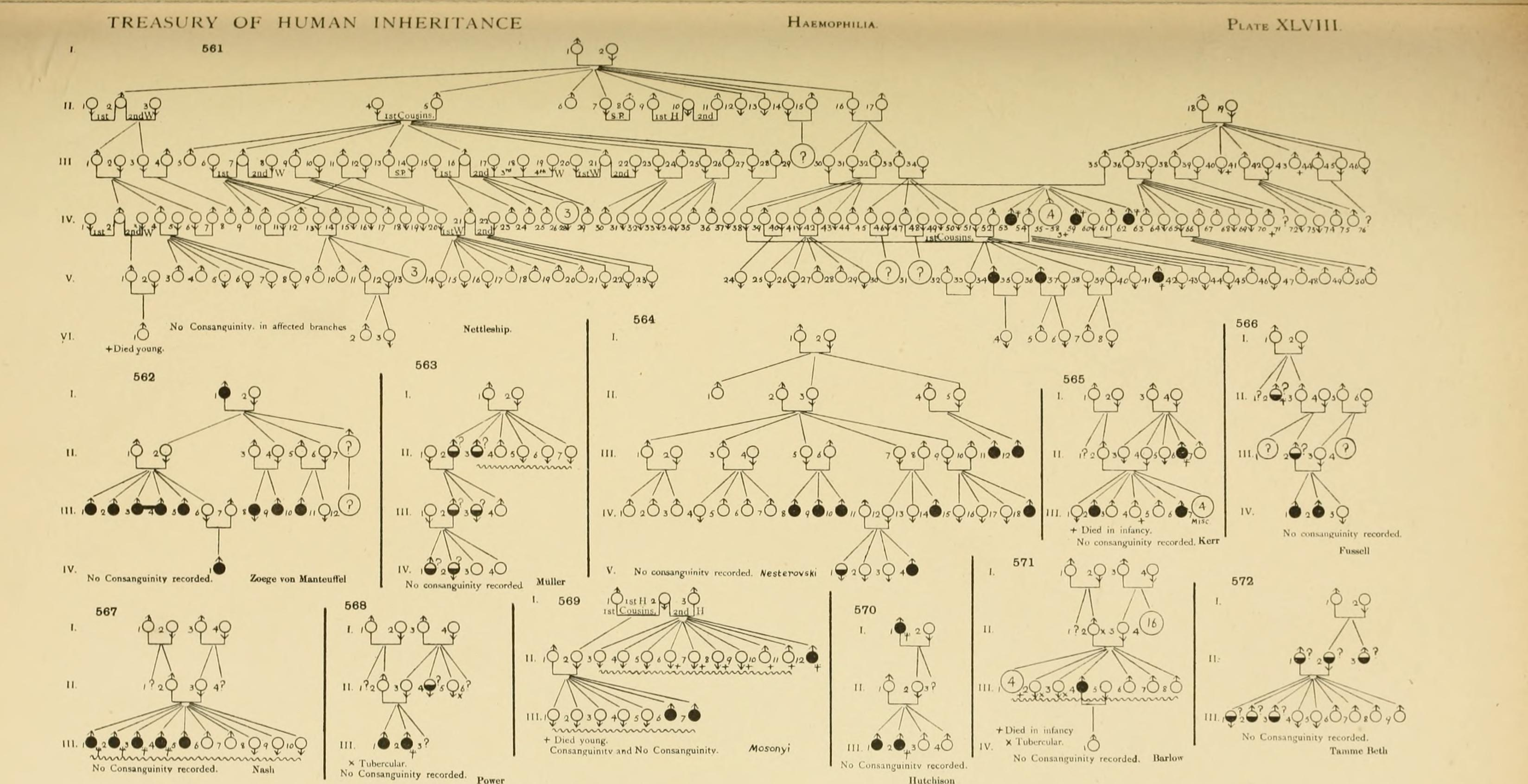
An example of an inheritance chart, found in many publications of the Galton Laboratory.

- Eugenics Laboratory Lecture Series , a series of lectures meant for general audiences to further engage understandings of eugenics outside of academic spaces.
- Eugenics Laboratory Memoirs , a series of memoirs from authors including Ethel Elderton, Karl Pearson, David Heron, Amy Barrington.
- Questions of the Day and of the Fray , a eugenics memoir series written from 1910 to 1923.
- Annals of Eugenics, created by Karl Pearson in 1925, which continues as the Annals of Human Genetics.
- Studies in National Deterioration, a series of studies published between 1906 and 1924.

== Galton Professors of Eugenics/Genetics ==
Originally established as the Galton Chair in National Eugenics, the post was renamed under Penrose to be the Galton Professor of Human Genetics.

- Karl Pearson 1911–1933
- Ronald Fisher 1933–1943
- Lionel Penrose 1945–1965
- Harry Harris 1965–1976
- Bette Robson 1976–1994
- Nicholas Wood 2009–2020

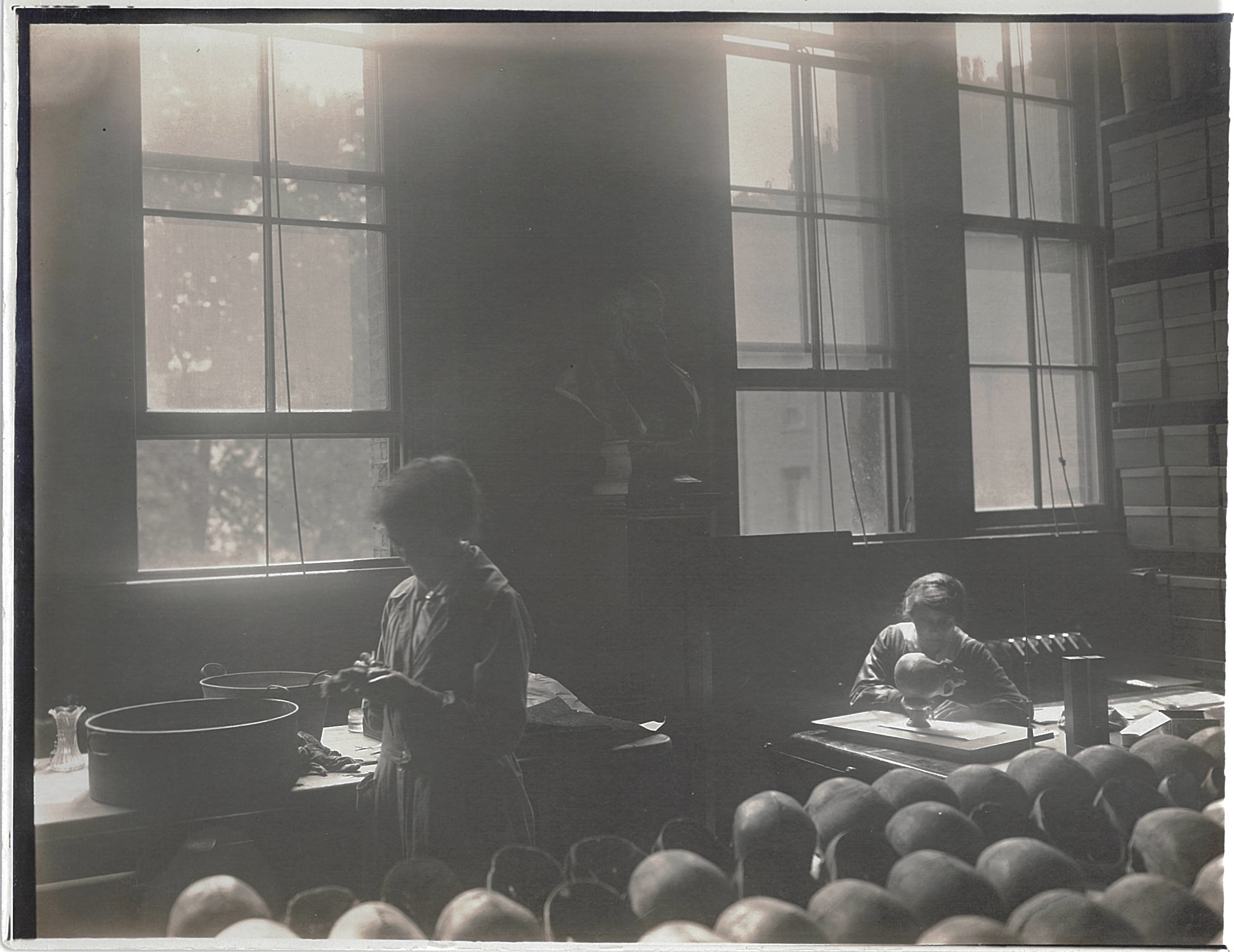
Two unidentified women in the laboratory. One is seated and appears to be measuring a human skull, the other is standing next to a bench.

== Workers ==
- Ethel Elderton: research assistant, secretary, and eventual Galton Research Scholar.
- Amy Barrington: computer of the Galton Laboratory.
- David Heron: Galton Research Fellow.
- Julia Bell: assistant, researcher.
- Alice Lee: assistant, researcher
- Adelaide Gladys Davin
- Mary Noel Karn
- Mary Hamilton Williams
- Dr. Eleanor Pairman

== Collections ==
The records of the Galton Laboratory are held at University College London. UCL aldo holds material in the following collections relating to the Galton Laboratory:

- The library of the Galton Laboratory, which includes the library of Francis Galton, contains around 5000 items, on variety of subjects published r from the early eighteenth to mid-twentieth century;
- Objects from the Galton Laboratory formed the foundation of the UCL Science Collections (a museum collection);
- The archive of Francis Galton;
- The archive of Karl Pearson;
- Letters from Pearson to Edgar Charles Fieller, who worked at the Galton Laboratory, discussing probability and random selection.

Many of the Galton Laboratory's publications have been digitized and are available through the Internet Archive. Archive material relating to eugenics has been digitised and is available through UCL's Digital Collections.

== See also ==
- Eugenics in the United Kingdom
- Eugenics
- Francis Galton
- Karl Pearson
- University College London

== Notes ==
Possibly succeeding Grüneberg.
