= Weldon Memorial Prize =

Annual prize in statistical biology by Oxford University

The Weldon Memorial Prize, also known as the Weldon Memorial Prize and Medal, is given yearly by the University of Oxford. The prize is to be awarded

without regard to nationality or membership of any University to the person who, in the judgement of the electors, has, in the ten years next preceding the date of the award, published the most noteworthy contribution to the development of mathematical or statistical methods applied to problems in Biology. (Biology shall, for the purposes of this clause, be interpreted as including Zoology, Botany, Anthropology, Sociology, Psychology, and Medical Science.)

It is named in honor of Walter Frank Raphael Weldon, former Linacre Professor of Zoology at the university. It was established through the efforts of Francis Galton and Karl Pearson. Although intended to be given yearly, it has in the past been given less often.

== Recipients ==
- 1911 David Heron
- 1912 Karl Pearson
- 1914 Charles B. Goring
- 1920 J. Arthur Harris
- 1920 Ethel M. Elderton
- 1923 Johannes Schmidt
- 1926 Major Greenwood
- 1930 Ronald Aylmer Fisher
- 1932 Geoffrey M. Morant
- 1935 Egon S. Pearson
- 1938 J. B. S. Haldane
- 1941 Julia Bell
- 1944 Prasanta Chandra Mahalanobis
- 1947 Sewall Wright
- 1950 Lionel S. Penrose
- 1953 Frank Yates
- 1956 David J. Finney
- 1959 E. B. Ford
- 1962 Kenneth Mather
- 1965 Motoo Kimura
- 1969 I. Michael Lerner
- 1971 Maurice S. Bartlett
- 1974 David Kendall
- 1978 Luca Cavalli-Sforza
- 1980 Robert May
- 1983 David R. Cox
- 1986 Tomoko Ohta
- 1989 Roy M. Anderson
- 1992 George Oster
- 1995 Michael P. Hassell
- 1996 Martin Nowak
- 1998 John Maynard Smith
- 2000 Joseph Felsenstein
- 2001 Elizabeth Thompson
- 2002 Warren Ewens
- 2003 Richard Peto
- 2004 David Sankoff
- 2005 Geoffrey West
- 2006 Nancy Kopell
- 2007 Brian Charlesworth
- 2008 Peter Donnelly
- 2009 David Spiegelhalter
- 2010 Russell S. Lande
- 2011 David Haussler
- 2012 Gil McVean
- 2013 Karl Friston
- 2014 John McNamara
- 2015 David J. Brenner
- 2016 Sarah (Sally) P. Otto
- 2017 Shripad Tuljapurkar
- 2018 Angela McLean
- 2019 Stephen W. Pacala
- 2020 Simon Myers
- 2022 Deirdre Hollingsworth, Graham Medley, and Julia R. Gog on behalf of the Scientific Pandemic Influenza Group on Modelling, Operational sub-group (SPI-M-O).
- 2024 L. Mahadevan
