= The Grammar of Science =

1892 book by Karl Pearson

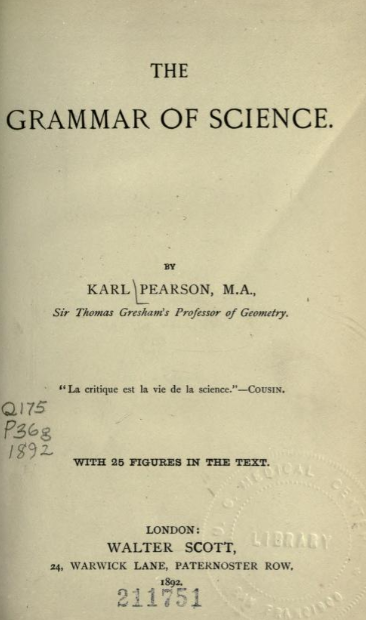
- Title page for The Grammar of Science (1892)
- Author: Karl Pearson
- Genre: Non-fiction
- Publication date: 1892
- Media type: Print (hardcover)

The Grammar of Science is a book by Karl Pearson first published in hardback in 1892. In 1900, the second edition, published by Adam & Charles Black, appeared. The third, revised, edition was also published by Adam & Charles Black in 1911. It was recommended by Einstein to his friends of the Olympia Academy. Several themes were covered in this book that later became part of the theories of Einstein and other scientists, such as:

- the relativity of motion to a frame of reference (fixed stars),
- the equivalence of "matter" and energy,
- physics as geometry,
- the non-existence of the ether,
- the importance of creative imagination rather than mere fact-gathering,
- antimatter,
- fourth dimension,
- wrinkles in space,
- molecular relative position and motion, and
- motion of corpuscles as relative motion in a field.

== Chapter I ==
"Introductory – The Scope and Method of Science"

1. The scope of science is to ascertain truth in every possible branch of knowledge. There is no sphere of inquiry which lies outside the legitimate field of science. To draw a distinction between the scientific and philosophical fields is obfuscation.
2. The scientific method has the following distinctive features:

- (a) careful and accurate measurement of data, and "observation of their correlation and sequence";
- (b) discovery of scientific laws by aid of the creative imagination;
- (c) self-criticism;
- (d) final decisions having equal validity for all normally constituted minds.

1. The claims of science to our support depend on:

- (a) the efficient mental training it provides for the citizen;
- (b) the light it brings to bear on many important social problems;
- (c) the increased comfort it adds to practical life;
- (d) the permanent gratification it yields to the aesthetic judgment.

== Chapter II ==
"The Facts of Science"

1. Immediate sense-impressions form permanent impresses in the brain which psychically correspond to memory. The union of immediate sense-impressions with associated stored impressions leads to the formation of "constructs," which we project "outside ourselves," and term phenomena or appearances. The real world lies for us in such phenomenal constructs and not in shadowy things-in-themselves. "Outside" and "inside" oneself are alike ultimately based on sense-impressions; but from these sense-impressions by association, mechanical and mental, we form conceptions and draw inferences. These are the facts of science, and its field is essentially the contents of the mind.
2. When an interval elapses between sense-impression and muscular exertion, and the interval contains cerebral activity marking the revival and combination of past sense-impresses, we are said to think or be conscious. Consciousness of something external is an inference which, not yet having been verified by immediate sense-impression, we term an "eject;" it is conceivable, however, that it could become an object. Consciousness has no meaning other than to nervous systems akin to our own; it is illogical to assert that all matter is conscious, still more that consciousness or will can exist outside matter.
3. The term knowledge is meaningless when extended beyond the sphere in which we may legitimately infer consciousness, or when applied to things outside the area of thought, i.e., to metaphysical terms dignified by the name of conceptions although they do not ultimately flow from sense-impressions.

== Chapter III ==
"The Scientific Law"

1. Scientific Law is of a totally different nature from civil law; it does not involve an intelligent lawgiver, a command and a corresponding duty. It is a brief description in mental shorthand of as wide a range as possible of the sequences of our sense-impressions.
2. There are two distinct meanings to natural law: the mere routine of perception, and the scientific law or formula describing the field of nature. The "reason" in natural law is only obvious when we speak of law in the latter sense, and then it is really placed there by the human mind. Thus the supposed reason behind natural law does not enable us to pass from the routine of perceptions to anything of the nature of reason behind the world of sense-impression.
3. The fact that the human reflective faculty is able to express the routine of perceptions in mental formulae may be due to this routine being a product of the perceptive faculty itself. The perceptive faculty appears to be selective and to have developed in co-ordination with the reflective faculty. Of the world outside sensation science can only logically infer chaos, or the absence of the conditions of knowledge; no human concept, such as order, reason, or consciousness, can be logically projected into it.

== Chapter IV ==
"Cause and Effect – Probability"

1. Cause is scientifically used to denote an antecedent stage in a routine of perceptions. In this sense, "force" as a cause is meaningless. First cause is only a limit, permanent or temporary, to knowledge. No instance, certainly not "will," occurs in our experience of an arbitrary first cause in the popular sense of the word.
2. There is no inherent necessity in the routine of perceptions, but the permanent existence of rational beings necessitates a routine of perceptions; the possibility of a thinking being ceases with the cessation of routine. The only necessity we are acquainted with exists in the sphere of conceptions; routine in perceptions may possibly be due to the constitution of the perceptive faculty.
3. Proof in the field of perceptions is the demonstration of overwhelming probability. Logically we ought to use the word know only of conceptions, and reserve the word believe for perceptions. "I know that the angle at the circumference on any diameter of a circle is right," but "I believe that the sun will rise tomorrow." The proof that a breach of routine will not occur for a finite future depends upon the solid experience that we are ignorant only in areas in which, statistically, all constitutions of the unknown are found to be equally probable.

== Chapter V ==
"Contingency and Correlation – The Insufficiency of Causation"

1. Routine in perceptions is a relative term; the idea of causation is extracted by conceptual processes from phenomena, it is neither a logical necessity, nor an actual experience. We can merely classify things as like; we cannot reproduce sameness, but we can only measure how relatively like follows relatively like. The wider view of the universe sees all phenomena as correlated, but not causally related.
2. Whether phenomena are qualitative or quantitative, a classification leads to a contingency table. From such a table we can measure the degree of dependence between any two phenomena. Causation is the limit to such a table, when it contains an indefinitely large number of "cells," but in each array only one such cell is occupied. Mathematical function arises when the belt of dots which are the actual result of all experience shrivels up into a curve. It is a purely conceptual limit which is just as much a conceptual limit to actual experience when we use a multiplicity of "causes."
3. The intellectual gain of this contingency category lies in the fact that it sees variation as the fundamental factor in phenomena. Determinatism is the result of supposing "sameness" instead of a mere classificatory "likeness" in phenomena. Variation and correlation include causation and determinatism as special cases, if indeed they have any actual existence in regard to phenomena. No experience we have at present justifies us, however, in assuming them to be anything but conceptual limits created by human need for economy of thought, and as little inherent in phenomena themselves as geometrical surfaces or centres of force.

== Chapter VI ==
"Space and Time"

1. Space and time are not realities in the phenomenal world, but the modes under which we perceive things apart. They are not infinitely large nor infinitely divisible, but are essentially limited by the contents of our perception.
2. Scientific concepts are, as a rule, limits drawn in conception to processes which can be started but not carried to a conclusion in perception. The historical origin of the concepts of geometry and physics can thus be traced. Concepts such as geometrical surface, atom, and ether, are not asserted by science to have a real existence in or behind phenomena, but are valid as shorthand methods of describing the correlation and sequence of phenomena. From this standpoint conceptual space and time can be easily appreciated, and the danger avoided of projecting their ideal infinities and eternities into the real world of perception.

== Chapter VII ==
"The Geometry of Motion"

1. All the notions by aid of which we describe and measure change are geometrical, and thus are not real perceptual limits. They are forms distinguishing and classifying the contents of our personal experience under the mixed mode of motion. The principal forms are point-motion, spin of a rigid body, and strain. Motion is found to be relative, never absolute; for example, it is meaningless to speak of the motion of a point without reference to what system is related to the motion of the point.
2. An analysis of point-motion leads us to the conceptions of velocity and acceleration. Velocity is a proper measure of the manner in which position is instantaneously changing. Acceleration is a proper measure of how velocity itself is an increased change. It is found that a motion is fully determined. Theoretically, a complete description of the path and position at each instant of time may be deduced when the velocity in any one position and the acceleration for all positions is given.
3. The parallelogram law as the general rule for combining motions is the foundation of the synthesis by which complex motions are constructed out of simple motions.

== Chapter VIII ==
"Matter"

The notion of matter is found to be equally obscure whether we seek for definition in the writings of physicists or of "common sense" philosophers. The difficulties with regard to it appear to arise from asserting the phenomenal but imperceptible existence of mere conceptual symbols. Change of sense-impression is the proper term for external perception. Motion is the proper term for our conceptual symbolisation of this change. Of perception the question "what moves" and "why it moves" are seen to be idle. In the field of conception, the moving bodies are geometrical ideals with merely descriptive motions.

In order to understand that we can perceive change of sense-impression but we can only conceive motion, three questions must be asked: "What moves? Why does it move? How does it move?". Science can only answer the question "How does it move?". The others are unintelligible, because we find that matter, force, and "action at a distance" are not terms which express real problems of the phenomenal world.

== Chapter IX ==
"The Laws of Motion"

The physicist forms a conceptual model of the universe by the aid of corpuscles. These corpuscles are only symbols for the component parts of perceptual bodies and are not to be considered as in any way resembling definite perceptual equivalents. The corpuscles with which we have to deal are ether-element, prime-atom, atom, molecule, and particle. We conceive them to move in the manner which enables us most accurately to describe the sequences of our sense-impressions. This manner of motion is summed up in the so-called laws of motion. These laws hold in the first place for particles, but they have been frequently assumed to be true for all corpuscles. It is more reasonable, however, to conceive that a great part of mechanism flows from the structure of gross "matter."

The proper measure of mass is found to be a ratio of mutual accelerations, and force is seen to be a certain convenient measure of motion, and not its cause. The customary definitions of mass and force, as well as the Newtonian statement of the laws of motion, are shown to abound in metaphysical obscurities. It is also questionable whether the principles involved in the current statements as to the superposition and combination of forces are scientifically correct when applied to atoms and molecules. The hope for future progress lies in clearer conceptions of the nature of ether and of the structure of gross "matter."

The general laws of motion are expressed as extensions of Newton's Laws

First Law: "Every corpuscle in the conceptual model of the universe must be conceived as moving with due regard to the presence of every other corpuscle, although for very distant corpuscles the regard paid is extremely small as compared with that paid to immediate neighbours."

Second Law: "Principle of Inertia"

Third Law: "Mutual Acceleration is determined by Relative Position"

Fourth Law: "The ratio of the acceleration of A due to B to the acceleration of B due to A must always be considered to be the same whatever be the position of A and B, and whatever be the surrounding field"

Fifth Law: "The Definition of Force – The force of B on A is equal and opposite to the force of A on B"

== Chapter X ==
"Modern Physical Ideas"

The development of physical science over the last twenty years has revealed phenomena which illustrate clearly the principles and method of the preceding chapters. The Newtonian scheme of dynamics has been shown to be an approximation valid only for gross matter and our gross senses. There is reasonable ground for supposing that an electro-magnetic scheme of the constitution of matter will prove far more comprehensive. But there are outstanding difficulties, notably that gravitation has so far defied all efforts to bring it into line with this scheme, and that no simple concept has yet been furnished to represent the positive electricity of experiment.

The principles of conservation of energy, momentum, and mass all become meaningless without an ether which is as much and as little a reality as matter, and then mass, energy, momentum, are quantities in the same category with force.

The constancy of the mass of a body in material dynamics, which is the whole experimental basis of that science, is replaced by the conception of all electrons of the same type (negative, possibly also positive) being identical in character.

The ether is a purely conceptual medium which, as far as theory is at present developed, is structureless except that at isolated points there exist centres at which its properties are exceptional. These centres, by their mutual motion and grouping, constitute the model of the sequence of natural phenomena.

New light is thrown on our conceptions of space and time. They are interdependent and conditioned by the phenomena which they are used to describe. The phrase "motion relative to the ether" becomes meaningless. The ether is becoming more and more clearly a concept in the mind of each observer.

== Editions in print ==
- The Grammar of Science (1892), Dover Publications 2004 edition, ISBN 0-486-49581-7

== Editions online ==
- The Grammar of Science (1900) A. and C. Black.
- The Grammar of Science (1900) A. and C. Black.
