= Amy Barrington =

Irish teacher

Amy Barrington (died 6 January 1942) was an Irish teacher and scientist who was closely associated with the practices and beliefs of eugenics. She published several papers on that subject as well as indexing a work on history. She also wrote an account of the family history of the Barringtons. Amy Barrington herself states in 'The Barrington family history' that she occupied herself in learning and travelling for 26 years before deciding to pursue her family's ancestral history. She was the youngest daughter of Edward Barrington of Fassaroe, Bray, County Wicklow, Ireland.

On 6 January 1942, Barrington died of congestive heart failure at her residence in Harlech, Dundrum, Co. Dublin. At the time of her death, her occupation was that of a 'gentlewoman'. According to civil records she was also a 'spinster' at the time of her death. She left a total of £3,144 in her will, which equates to approximately €153,570 in modern-day currency.

Extract from Knowing Their Place: Intellectual Life of Women in the 19th Century by Professor Brendan Walsh: "...She sat the Classical Tripos in 1885 and became a teacher in Australia at the Girls' Grammar School, Brisbane (1888–93) and three years (1888–91) in a school in Vancouver. In 1906 she became a lecturer in Bedford College Training Department in London (1907–19), working in teacher education. She also did pioneer work (1906–19) in eugenics at the Francis Galton Laboratory at University College, London..."

== Family life ==
Amy Barrington was the second youngest daughter of Edward George Barrington and his second wife Huldah (Strangman) Barrington. She had four sisters, Anna Barrington, Huldah Barrington, Victoria Barrington and Marion Barrington, as well one brother, Richard Barrington. Amy Barrington also had many half-siblings from her father's previous relationship with Sarah Barrington. Her family home is located in Fassaroe, Bray, County Wicklow, Ireland. After the passing of John Barrington, Edward Barrington, his son and father of Amy Barrington had trouble renewing the lease on Glendruid house for his mother. Following the death of his mother, Margaret Barrington, the house was passed down to Amy's uncle, Manliffe. He then left the house to his brother Arthur, who then passed the house to his nephew Francis Malone. Frank then left the house to his widowed wife Victoria Barrington.

Their home in Fassaroe was rented by her father and then bought by her brothers Richard M. Barrington under the Land Purchase Acts from George Crampton. Her grandfather, John Barrington, is buried in a private cemetery at the home along with other Barrington ancestors.

Barrington went on to write a book about her family's history called "The Barringtons – A Family History", located in the National Library of Ireland. She was able to gather information about her family due to her sister, Mrs. Davis and her cousin Emily Malone collecting and storing pedigrees of the family. The information within the pedigrees allowed Barrington to investigate her family's history.

== Educational achievements ==
In 1902, Barrington was introduced to Karl Pearson; she became the first voluntary worker in his Biometric laboratory and later a paid assistant in the Galton Laboratory for Eugenics owned by Sir Francis Galton. Karl Pearson was the director of the Galton Laboratory. In lecture series published by the Galton Laboratory, she was referred to as the computer of the Galton Laboratory. She carried out many studies in relation to eugenics, as seen below.

== Works ==
- A Preliminary Study of Extreme, Alcoholism in Adults By Amy Barrington, and Karl Pearson (1910)
- Hereditary Disorders of Bone Development. By Amy Barrington. At the University Press (1925)
- A First Study of the Inheritance of Vision and of the relative influence of Heredity and Environment on Sight, etc. (Eugenics Laboratory Memoirs. no. 5.) – 1909 by Amy Barrington (Author), Karl Pearson (Author)
- A Second Study of the Influence of Parental Alcoholism on the Physique and Ability of the Offspring: Being a Reply to Certain Medical Critics of the First Memoir and an Examination of the Rebutting Evidence Cited by Them, Issues 13–14 Amy Barrington, Karl Pearson, Ethel M. Elderton, Dulau and Company, 1910
- Dwarfism. With plates, and with a bibliography and iconography by Amy Barrington (Eugenics Laboratory Memoirs. no. 15.) – 1912 by Harold Rischbieth (Author), Amy Barrington
- On the Correlation of Fertility with Social Value. A cooperative study (Eugenics Laboratory Memoirs. vol. 18.) – 1913 by Ethel Mary Elderton (Author), Amy Barrington

== Historical works ==
When Barrington was a girl she developed an interest in heredity. This was before the study of heredity was popular. She was interested in distinguishing the different characteristics of her half-brothers and sisters from those of the children of her own mother. Barrington believed that the difference of characteristics must have been through the strain of blood and did not realise how important ancestry is in relation to heredity, only usually focusing on the importance of the parents.

In "A First Study of the Inheritance of Vision and of the relative influence of Heredity and Environment on Sight, etc", Barrington reached out and used other people's memoirs to guide her study in this field. With some studies being in German, she draws on the difference of how studies are recorded in English (used in Ireland at the time) and German.

- The Barringtons – A family history (Dublin University Press, 1917)
- The Inhabitants of Westminster in the reign of Charles I. From the Subsidy Rolls in the Public Record Office, 1625–1645. Transcribed by the Rev. T. C. Dale; Indexed by Miss Amy Barrington – 1935 by Amy Barrington (Author), T. C. Dale (Author)

== See also ==
- Galton Laboratory
- Richard Manliffe Barrington, scientist born at Fassaroe, Bray, Co. Wicklow
- Galton Institute
- Charles Barrington, mountaineer of Fassaroe
