= Richard Barrington (naturalist) =

Irish naturalist (1849–1915)

Richard Manliffe Barrington
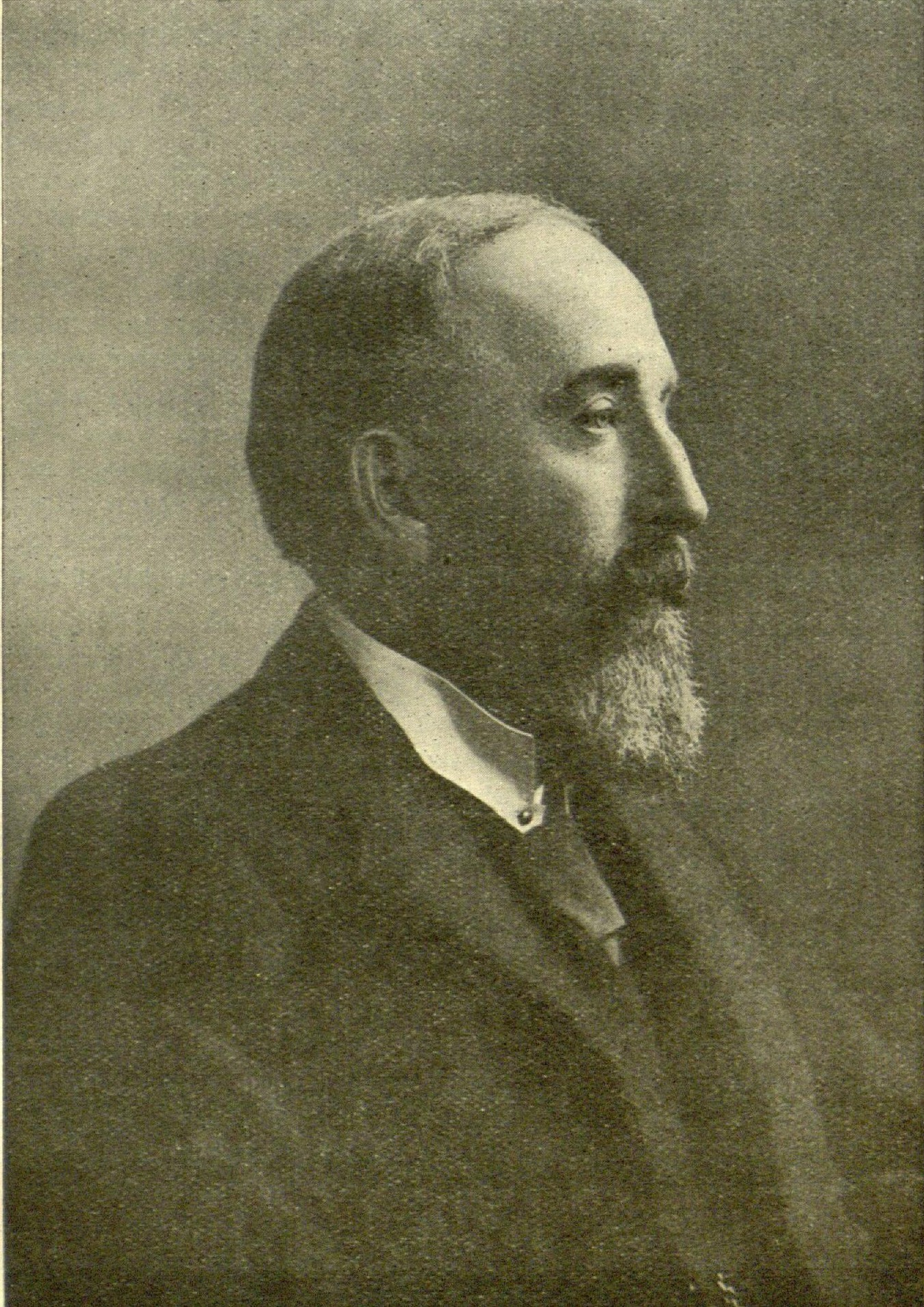
- Born: 22 May 1849; Fassaroe, County Wicklow, Ireland
- Died: 15 September 1915 (aged 66)
- Known for: Ornithology
- Scientific career
- Fields: Botany, Ornithology

Richard Manliffe Barrington (22 May 1849 – 15 September 1915) was an Irish naturalist noted for his work tracking the migration paths of birds across Ireland.

== Early life and family ==
Richard Manliffe Barrington was born at his family home, Fassaroe, County Wicklow on 22 May 1849. He was his father;'s, Edward Barrington, youngest son of eight, and the eldest child and only son of his mother, Huldah Barrington (née Strangman). His father was interested in science, in particular meteorological recording. His uncle Richard was a botanist, and his uncle John founded the Barrington Lecture Trust. His sister was Amy Barrington.

As a "delicate child", Barrington was educated primarily at home, and took an interest in natural science. In 1866, he entered Trinity College Dublin (TCD), and graduated in 1870 with honours in experimental and natural science. He was called to the bar in 1875, but preferred land valuation and farming, and became involved in the management of the family farm after the death of his father in 1877.

In 1897, Barrington married Lena Gyles of Kilmurray, County Waterford.

== Natural history ==
While at TCD, Barrington met Alexander Goodman More, with whom he became a close friend who influenced him greatly. Barrington would go on long summer excursions to mountains, islands and lakes in the south and west of Ireland, taking notes on birds and plants. He wrote reports on the flora of Lough Ree, Lough Erne, Ben Bulben, Tory Island and the Blaskets all published by the Royal Irish Academy as part of More's Cybele Hibernica (1872).

Primarily, Barrington's scientific papers are on birds. His best known work is The migration of birds, as observed at Irish lighthouses and lightships including the original reports from 1888 to 1897, now published for the first time, and an analysis of these and of the previously put together with an appendix giving the measurements of about 1600 wings London : R.H. Porter. Only 350 copies of this 667 page work were printed. This work was based on the correspondence he began with lighthouse keepers on bird migration in 1882. The work was funded until 1888 by the British Association's migration committee, after which point, he funded it himself. The book included numerous new Irish records, and the specimens he received were either deposited in the National Museum of Ireland of in his own personal museum in Fassaroe. The lighthouse keepers sent Barrington a leg and a wing of each bird that died striking the lighthouse, and noted any bird sightings as well as any birds shot in the environs of the lighthouses.

Barrington was one of the leaders of the Royal Irish Academy Rockall expedition of 1896 with William Spotswood Green. Robert Lloyd Praeger, William Francis de Vismes Kane, and John A. Harvie Brown of Dunipace, a Scottish gentleman naturalist, also took part. Travelling on the SS Granuaile, the expedition aimed to record and collect geological and biological specimens, and investigate the potential of establishing a meteorological station there. The expedition did not land due to high seas, but were the first to record the birds of Rockall, and discounted the possibility of a meteorological station.

Barrington was a member of the Royal Irish Academy, Royal Dublin Society, Irish Society for the Protection of Birds, Statistical and Social Inquiry Society, and the Royal Zoological Society of Ireland. He was a founding member of the Dublin Naturalists' Field Club. He was also a Fellow of the Linnean Society, a Member of the British Ornithologists' Union, and of the British Association Committee for obtaining Observations on the Migration of Birds at Light- houses and Lightships formed to study bird migration. He was also interested in mammals, meteorology, agriculture, wider Irish science and economics.

He also travelled widely: Iceland in 1881, remote Scottish islands in 1883, 1886, and 1890, and Switzerland in 1876 and 1882. He climbed many of the peaks in the Alps, such as the Eiger in 1876, and in 1884, he walked across the Rockies. He reached 6 peaks in the Alps in 10 consecutive days as a members of the British Alpine Club. It was reported that his brother, Charles, was the first person to climb the Eiger in 1858.

== Death and legacy ==
Barrington retired from the land commission in early 1915. He died on 15 September 1915 while driving his son home from Dublin. In an obituary to Barrington, Robert Lloyd Praeger described him as "a singularly lovable man."

His herbarium is held in the National Botanic Gardens, Glasnevin. His collection of bird specimens consisting of the wings and legs of birds collected by light-keepers stored in paper envelopes were bequeathed to the National Museum of Ireland. The collection includes over 3000 specimens from 48 lighthouses and 10 lightships from 1881 to 1897. There are also examples of the mounted, taxidermy birds from his collection on display.
