= Deirdre Hollingsworth =

British epidemiologist and tropical disease researcher

Deirdre Hollingsworth FIMA FRSTMH
- Medical career
- Profession: Doctor
- Institutions: University of Oxford; Isaac Newton Institute; Liverpool School of Tropical Medicine; Imperial College London
- Research: Epidemiology
- Notable works: HIV-1 Transmission, by Stage of Infection (2008); Mitigation measures on COVID-19 pandemic (2020)
- Awards: SPI-M-O Award for Modelling and Data Support (2022); Weldon Memorial Prize (2022)

Deirdre Hollingsworth (Note: also known as T. Déirdre Hollingsworth) is a British epidemiologist and a researcher on diseases from the University of Oxford, who made notable contributions to research on HIV/AIDS, malaria, COVID-19, and neglected tropical diseases (NTD). She worked with WHO and other international organizations to reduce infectious diseases in low and middle-income countries. She also founded the "NTD modelling consortium", which partnered with WHO to study the impact of COVID-19 on NTDs and laid down guidelines to control lymphatic filariasis. As a regular member of Scientific Pandemic Influenza Group on Modelling, Operational sub-group (SPI-M-O), a subgroup of Scientific Advisory Group for Emergencies (SAGE), Hollingsworth contributed to the subgroup and was awarded the Weldon Memorial Prize for her contributions.

Hollingsworth chaired the Isaac Newton Institute's COVID-19 modelling programme, which connected modellers who were researching on the pandemic. As a fellow of the Royal Society, she served on the steering committee for the Society's Rapid Assistance in Modelling the Pandemic (RAMP) and also worked on its report on the reproduction number.

A 2007 research on HIV/AIDS in which Hollingsworth was one of its co-authors found out that moderately infectious (or with medium viral load) patients have a higher risk of spreading the virus than a highly infectious patient as the former is asymptomatic for longer periods of time. As a researcher at Liverpool School of Tropical Medicine in 2018, she and the other team members found a relationship between the spatial and individual heterogeneity for lymphatic filariasis. On 17 June 2025, she was awarded European Research Council (ERC) Advanced Grant to work on understanding about the transmission of infectious diseases.

In 2012, as a student of the School of Public Health, Imperial College London, she performed in a music charity concert that was held to raise funds for Schistosomiasis Control Initiative (SCI).
