= Charles Barrington (mountaineer) =

Irish mountain climber (1834–1901)

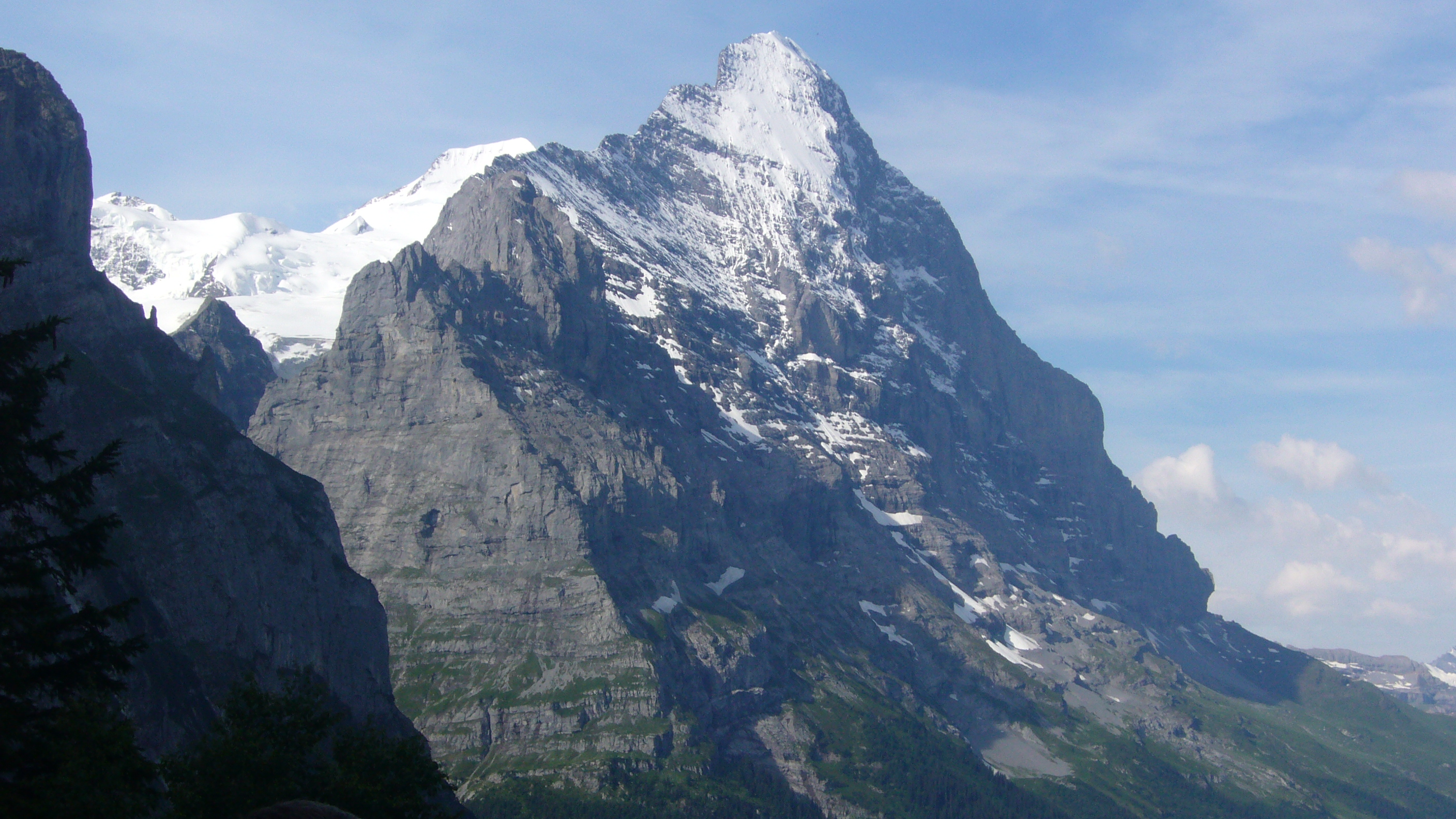
The Eiger

Charles Barrington (1834 – 20 April 1901), an Irishman from Fassaroe, Bray County Wicklow, was a merchant with little or no mountaineering experience who led the first team to successfully climb the Eiger on 11 August 1858. Heinrich Harrer, in his book about the Eiger north face – The White Spider (1959) – noted that Barrington would have attempted the first ascent of the Matterhorn instead, but did not have enough money to travel to Zermatt. With the support of two mountain guides, Christian Almer and Peter Bohren, he reached the summit of the Eiger via the west flank.

After the ascent, Charles Barrington returned to Ireland and never visited the Alps again. He owned and trained a famous racehorse, "Sir Robert Peel", that won the first Irish Grand National in 1870.

Barrington organized the first Irish mountain race in 1870, offering a gold watch to the winner of this running event, which was held on the Sugar Loaf mountain in County Wicklow.

He died at his family home in Earlsfort Terrace in Dublin on 20 April 1901, and is buried in Mount Jerome Cemetery.

== See also ==
- Amy Barrington teacher, scientist and family historian
- Richard Manliffe Barrington of Fassaroe, scientist
