= Men and Women's Club =

The Men and Women's Club was a London-based debating society founded by Karl Pearson to discuss relations between the sexes, such as marriage, sexuality, friendship and prostitution. It was composed of middle-class radical liberals, socialists and feminists, and was intellectually adventurous for its time. It met from 1885 to 1889, and the records of its meetings are now part of the Pearson collection at University College London.
