= William Palin Elderton =

Sir William Palin Elderton KBE PhD (Oslo) (1877–1962) was a British actuary who served as president of the Institute of Actuaries (1932–1934). Elderton also had a very long association with the statistical journal Biometrika. In its early days he published several articles, and in 1935 he became chairman of the Biometrika Trust.

In 1900 when he was training to be an actuary Elderton met Karl Pearson and was drawn into the University College statistical group. In 1902 Elderton computed the first tables of Pearson's chi-squared and in 1907 he published an exposition of the Pearson curves for actuaries. His sister Ethel M. Elderton worked for Pearson, and together the Eldertons wrote an introduction to the new ideas in statistics. She provided financial backing for Pearson's Anthropometric Laboratory, "his fourth laboratory".

Elderton was an invited speaker in the International Congress of Mathematicians 1908, Rome.

== Books ==
- W. Palin Elderton (1906) Frequency-Curves and Correlation. London: Charles and Edwin Layton, 172 pages. 2nd edition, 1927; 3rd edition, 1938; Elderton, William Palin (30 June 2011). 2011 pbk reprint of 1953 4th edition. Cambridge University Press. ISBN 978-1-107-60129-1.
- W. Palin Elderton and Ethel M. Elderton (1909) Primer of Statistics. London: A&C Black Ltd. 2nd edition, 1910; Elderton, Sir William Palin; Elderton, Ethel Mary (1912). 1912 3rd edition.
- W. Palin Elderton and Richard C. Fippard (1914)The Construction of Mortality and Sickness Tables : a Primer. London : A. & C. Black.

== Papers ==
- Elderton, William Palin (1902). "Tables for Testing the Goodness of Fit of Theory to Observation". Biometrika. 1 (2): 155–163. doi:10.1093/biomet/1.2.155.
- William Palin Elderton (1949): A few statistics on the length of English words. In: Journal of the Royal Statistical Society, Series A (General), Vol. CXII, Part IV, p. 436-445.

== Elderton's work ==
- Karl-Heinz Best (2009): Wortlängen im Englischen. In: Glottometrics 19, p. 1-10. (PDF ram-verlag.) Review of Elderton's model of word length distributions proposing alternative models.)
- Peter Grzybek (2006): History and Methodology of Word Length Studies. The State of the Art. In: Peter Grzybek (ed.): Contributions to the Science of Text and Language: Word length studies and related issues. Dordrecht: Springer, S. 15-90. ISBN 978-1-4020-4067-2. (Grzybek discusses Elderton's model of word length distributions p. 19-26.)

== Obituaries ==
- William P. Elderton FIA; CBE; KBE. TFA, 28 (1962-1964) p. 193-195.
- William P. Elderton FIA; CBE; KBE. JIA, 88 (1962) p. 245-252.
- Pearson, E. S. (1962). "William Palin Elderton, 1877–1962". Biometrika. 49 (3–4): 297–303. doi:10.1093/biomet/49.3-4.297.
- Best, Karl-Heinz (2009): William Palin Elderton (1877-1962). In: Glottometrics 19, p. 99-101. (PDF ram-verlag.) (In German)
- F. A. A. Menzler Sir William Palin Elderton, 1877–1962, Journal of the Royal Statistical Society. Series A (General), Vol. 125, No. 4 (1962), pp. 669–672
