= Annals of Human Genetics =

- Discipline: Human genetics
- Language: English
- Edited by: Rosemary Ekong

Publication details
- Former name: Annals of Eugenics
- History: 1925–present
- Publisher: John Wiley & Sons
- Frequency: Bimonthly
- Impact factor: 1.670 (2020)

Standard abbreviations
- ISO 4: Ann. Hum. Genet.

Indexing
- CODEN: ANHGAA
- ISSN: 0003-4800 (print); 1469-1809 (web)
- LCCN: 28012242
- OCLC no.: 472337129

Links
- Journal homepage; Online access; Online archive

The Annals of Human Genetics is a bimonthly peer-reviewed scientific journal covering human genetics. It was established in 1925 by Karl Pearson as the Annals of Eugenics, with as subtitle, Darwin's epigram "I have no Faith in anything short of actual measurement and the rule of three". The journal obtained its current name in 1954 to reflect changing perceptions on eugenics.

== History ==
=== Annals of Eugenics ===
Pearson edited the journal from 1925 to 1933. In a brief valedictory letter published at the time of his resignation, Pearson wrote that he had fallen short of his aspirations, having published only five volumes over eight years due to the limited financial resources of the Galton Laboratory. He reaffirmed his belief that eugenics was worthy as a subject of academic study and as a source of public policy, but warned against hastily adopting eugenic legislation, noting that the field contained too many theories weakly supported by anecdote or opinion.

Ronald Fisher took over as editor in 1934 and with Humphry Rolleston, Reginald Ruggles Gates and Dr John Alexander Fraser Roberts on the editorial board. The journal focused more clearly on genetics and mathematical statistics.

=== Ethical issues with rejection of an article related to China ===
In June 2021, the Annals refused to publish an article, coauthored by David Curtis, its editor-in-chief at the time, that suggested that academic journals should take a stance against China's human rights violations in Xinjiang. The journal has defended rejecting the piece and claimed that a boycott against China would be unfair and counterproductive (other journals also rejected the piece). It also denied being unduly deferential to China.
