= Pastry wheel =

Kitchen tool

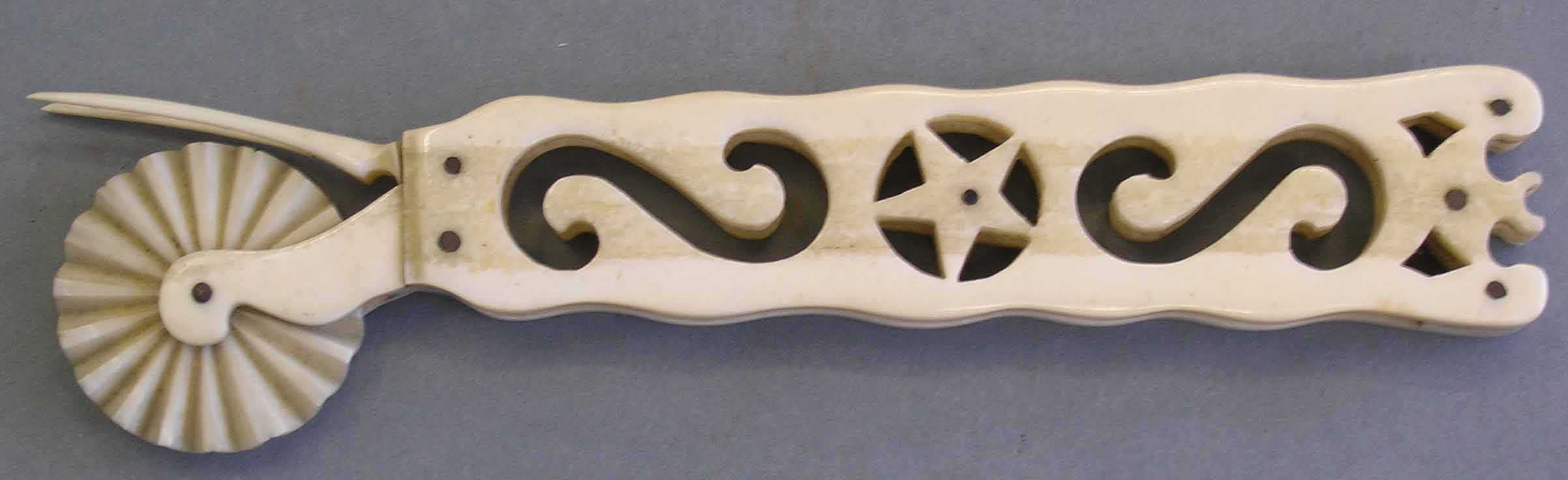
Scrimshaw pastry wheel, c. 1940, held by the Auckland War Memorial Museum

A pastry wheel, also known as a pastry jigger or jagging wheel, is a kitchen tool which is used to cut pastry and other doughs. A typical design includes a small wheel on a handle, which is shaped in such a way that it produces a jagged cut or other pattern in the dough. Pastry wheels for home use tend to have just one wheel, whereas ones for professional use may include multiple wheels so as to cut large quantities of dough at once. The handles of pastry wheels are made of varying materials depending on the wealth of their user, from simple wood or pottery, to silver, bone and mother of pearl.

Pastry cutters date back to antiquity, although the wheel did not appear until the late Middle Ages. The first known pastry cutter appears in a relief in a 4th-century B.C. Etruscan tomb. The first attested use of a pastry wheel in a professional kitchen dates from 1549 in Italy. They are also referred to in Bartolomeo Scappi's 1570 culinary opera. Both typical and atypical pastry wheels are held in museum collections, including several artistic wheels made entirely from scrimshaw.
