= Egon Pearson =

British statistician (1895–1980)

Egon Pearson CBE FRS
- Born: Egon Sharpe Pearson; 11 August 1895; Hampstead, London, England
- Died: 12 June 1980 (aged 84); Midhurst, England
- Education: University of Cambridge
- Known for: Neyman–Pearson lemma Frequentist statistics Type I and type II errors
- Spouses: Dorothy Eileen Jolly; Margaret Theodisia Scott
- Children: Judith Pearson; Sarah Pearson
- Parents: Karl Pearson (father); Maria Sharpe (mother)
- Awards: Weldon Memorial Prize (1935); Guy Medal (Gold, 1955); FRS (1966)
- Scientific career
- Fields: Statistics
- Workplaces: University College London
- Doctoral students: George E. P. Box; Bhaskar Kumar Ghosh; Pao-Lu Hsu; Norman Lloyd Johnson

Egon Sharpe Pearson CBE FRS (11 August 1895 – 12 June 1980) was an English mathematician and statistician. He was one of three children of Karl Pearson and Maria, née Sharpe.

== Career ==
Pearson was educated at Winchester College and Trinity College, Cambridge, and succeeded his father as professor of statistics at University College London and as editor of the journal Biometrika. He is best known for development of the Neyman–Pearson lemma of statistical hypothesis testing. He was elected a Fellow of the Econometric Society in 1948.

Pearson was President of the Royal Statistical Society in 1955–56, and was awarded its Guy Medal in gold in 1955. He was appointed a CBE in 1946.

Pearson was elected a Fellow of the Royal Society in March 1966. His candidacy citation read:

Known throughout the world as co-author of the Neyman–Pearson theory of testing statistical hypotheses, and responsible for many important contributions to problems of statistical inference and methodology, especially in the development and use of the likelihood ratio criterion. Has played a leading role in furthering the applications of statistical methods — for example, in industry, and also during and since the war, in the assessment and testing of weapons.

== Family life ==
Pearson married Eileen Jolly in 1934 and the couple had two daughters, Judith and Sarah. Eileen died of pneumonia in 1949. Pearson subsequently married Margaret Theodosia Scott in 1967 and the couple lived in Cambridge until Margaret's death in 1975. Pearson moved to West Lavington in Sussex and lived there until his death in 1980.

== Works ==
- On the Use and Interpretation of certain Test Criteria for the Purposes of Statistical Inference (coauthor Jerzy Neyman in Biometrika, 1928)
- The History of statistics in the XVIIth and XVIIIth centuries (1929). Commented version of a series of conference by his father.
- On the Problem of the Most Efficient Tests of Statistical Hypotheses (coauthor Jerzy Neyman, 1933)
- The Application of Statistical Methods to Industrial Standardisation and Quality Control. London: British Standards Institution, Publication Department. 1935.
- Karl Pearson : an appreciation of some aspects of his life and work (1938)
- The Selected Papers of E. S. Pearson. Cambridge University Press. 1966.
- Studies in the history of statistics and probability (1969, coauthor Maurice George Kendall)

== Collections ==
University College London holds the archive of Pearson, which was acquired in four separate accessions between 1980 and 2013. The collection includes material relating to Pearson's professional life such as lecture notes, draft publications, correspondence and papers relating to the Biometrika journal.
