= Yew tree cottage =

Coordinates: 52°32′46″N 03°15′04″W

Situated under the ramparts of Dolforwyn Castle, near Abermule in the Welsh county of Powys in the United Kingdom, Yew tree cottage is a part-17th-century timber-framed structure which once belonged to the celebrated antiquarian John Davies Knatchbull Lloyd.

It is home to the 'Dolforwyn yew' (taxus baccata), listed among the 850 most significant yews of England and Wales. The Dolforwyn yew has a girth of more than 18 feet (5.5 m) making it, according to dating graphs, more than a thousand years old, and much older than the castle above. The Dolforwyn yew is female and has small white flowers followed by very poisonous red berries. It is associated with a well 13 feet (4.0 m) distant, which has a depth of more than 20 feet (6.1 m) hewn through solid bedrock. It has been conjectured that this may be a Holy well since sacred wells were often associated with yews.
