= David Heron (statistician) =

Scottish statistician (1881–1969)

David Heron (28 April 1881 - 4 November 1969) was a Scottish statistician who was president of the Royal Statistical Society from 1947 to 1949.

He was born in Perth and studied Mathematics and Natural Philosophy at the University of St Andrews.

He was Karl Pearson's research assistant. Later he became a fellow at the Eugenics Laboratory of University College London.

In 1906 he published "On the relation of fertility in man to social status".

In 1915 he became chief statistician for the London Guarantee & Accident Company, an insurance company. During the Second World War, he was Director of Statistics for the Ministry of Food.

He was married to Ethel Medwin from 1916 until her death in 1959.
