= Percy Stocks =

British medical statistician (1889–1974)

Percy Stocks (1889 – 1974), was a British physician and medical statistician, who was awarded the Jenner Medal of the Royal Society of Medicine.
