= Alice Lee (mathematician) =

British mathematician (1858–1939)

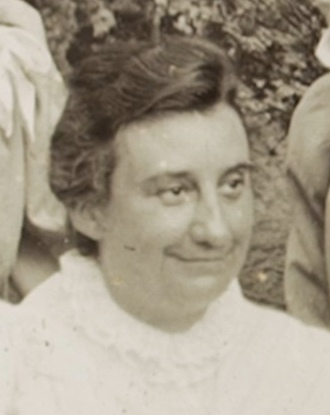
- Born: Alice Elizabeth Lee; 28 June 1858; Dedham, Essex, England
- Died: 5 October 1939 (aged 80); Rustington, Sussex, England
- Education: London University, Bedford College for Women
- Occupations: Mathematician, Statistician
- Parent(s): William Lee, Matilda Wren Baker
- Awards: Doctor of Science

Alice Lee (1858–1939) was a British statistician and mathematician, one of the first women to graduate from London University. She was awarded a PhD in 1901. She worked with Karl Pearson from 1892. She was notable for demonstrating that the correlation between cranial capacity and gender was not a sign of greater intelligence in men compared to women.

== Early life and education ==
Lee was born on 28 June 1858 in Dedham, Essex to William Lee (1821/2-1887), a master coach builder, and Matilda Wren(n) Baker (1822/3-1903). In 1876, she enrolled at Bedford College, the first college to provide education for girls in the United Kingdom. In 1879–80 she attended the college's first class in higher mathematics, and she was one of the first women to graduate from the University of London (Bedford College was then a women's college of the University), getting a BSc in 1884 and a BA in 1885. She then stayed at Bedford until 1916, initially as a lecturer in mathematics and physics. From 1892 to 1894, she also worked as 'resident helper' at the college, receiving free board and lodging in return. Later she also helped out in Greek and Latin classes.

== Scientific practice ==
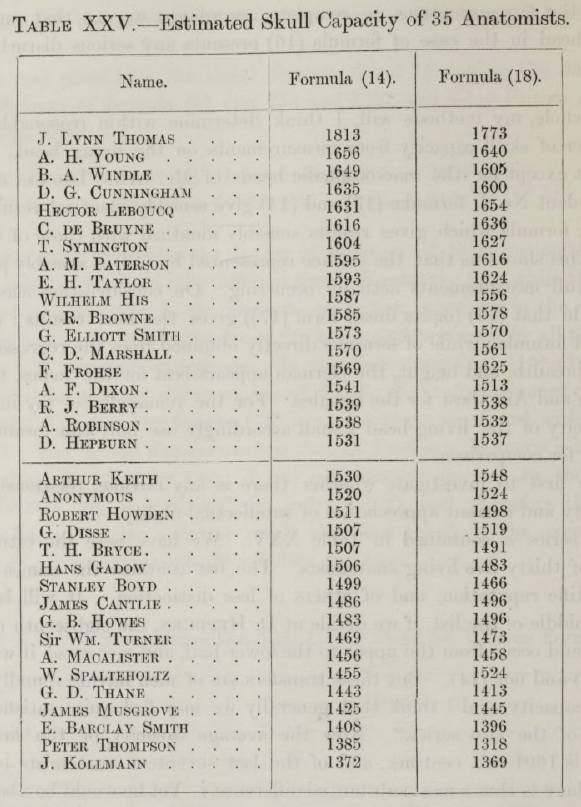
Lee's 1901 paper A study of the correlation of the human skull includes this table with estimated skull capacity of 35 anatomists, the lowest being that of Julius Kollmann who she calls "one of the ablest living anthropologists".

From about 1895, Lee attended Karl Pearson's statistics lectures at University College London and became interested in his application of statistical methods to evolutionary biology. Under his direction, she studied for an advanced degree. Her research topic was an investigation of variation in cranial capacity in humans and its correlation with intellectual ability. Lee courted controversy with her first published paper on the subject in 1901 A study of the correlation of the human skull. She examined three groups - women students from Bedford College, male faculty at University College, and a collection of distinguished male anatomists. The study demonstrated that there was no correlation between skull size and intelligence. Through a formula Lee calculated the cranial capacity from the anatomical measurements. The individuals in the groups were ranked in order of decreasing skull size, and identified by name. The dissertation was completed in 1899 and the findings caused considerable controversy. It was then an accepted theory in craniology that brain power increased with size, hence skull capacity was a measure of mental ability. As a consequence it was believed that men, who generally had larger heads than women, were mentally superior. Lee's findings shed doubt on that belief. Furthermore, one of the examiners of her dissertation was an anatomist with a low ranking in the skull capacity table of her study. Lee's study drew considerable criticism from her thesis examiners and from eugenicist Francis Galton, who questioned the originality and the scientific quality of her work. It was through Pearson's intervention that Lee was finally awarded a PhD in 1901. The following year Pearson published two papers which answered to the criticism that had been levelled at the findings of Lee's study. As there were no effective challenges, this work was soon accepted.

From 1892, Lee worked in Pearson's biometric laboratory. Initially as volunteer, Lee eventually received a salary of £90 a year and worked three days a week. Her duties included reducing data, computing correlation coefficients, creating histogram bar charts, and calculating new kind of chi-squared distribution statistics. In addition she did "all the hundred and one things that need doing" and acted as a laboratory secretary. Pearson funded her salary though a grant and showed embarrassment that compared to the salary of a female typist or stenographer Lee was not well paid. On the same grant Pearson also hired the sisters Beatrice Mabel Cave-Browne-Cave and Frances Cave-Browne-Cave as part-time computers. Lee held the paid position in the laboratory until 1907 and kept her lectureship at Bredford College until 1916. She carried out laboratory work in her spare time, or on a voluntary basis in Pearson's laboratory.

While working in the laboratory, Lee had started to pursue her own research projects. She published four papers in her own name and contributed to 26 others. Twice she declined to be listed as a co-author of a paper published by Pearson, arguing that she had only done the arithmetic. She was in the process of establishing a reputation as a statistician. For her dissertation she had developed a statistical model that estimated the cranial volume of living humans from external skull measurements. Her research on the statistical analysis of within species variation, a branch of evolutionary biology, continued until 1910 and led her to publish a succession of papers in the Biometrika from 1902 onwards. Lee's work also contributed to the preparation of tabulated functions, which were frequently used by contemporary statisticians and biologists. Her first and second publication on tabulated functions was published in the Reports of the British Science Association in 1896 and 1899. Later works on the subject were published in the Biometrika between 1914 and 1927.

== First World War ==
During the First World War Lee undertook statistical work for the government. From 1916 to 1918, she also calculated shell trajectories and compiled tables of all kinds for the Anti-Aircraft Experimental Section of the Munitions Inventions Department. Lee also worked on special computing projects for the Admiralty.

== Death and legacy ==
Lee's salary at Bedford College had always been a "women's wage", and the pension scheme had started too late for her to join. When she retired she had little to live on. In 1923, Pearson and Margaret Tuke, the former principal of Bedford College, petitioned the Home Office. Pearson emphasised her considerable research contribution, and her "services to the cause of scientific work". She was awarded a Civil List pension of £70 a year. She died in 1939 at the age of 80.

Gloria Steinem has credited Lee with dealing one of several death blows to craniology in the early 20th century. Flaws in craniology had been pointed out in the 19th century, but in the 1900s, craniology was discredited by empirical data. The final blow came in 1909 when Franklin P. Mall applied statistical measures to the study of the frontal lobe and fissures of the human brain, which had been associated with racial and sex differences, in his paper On several anatomical characters of the human brain, said to vary according to race and sex, with especial reference to the weight of the frontal lobe. He found no differences between male and female brains.

== Publications ==
- Lee, A. (1901) Data for the problem of evolution in man: A first study of the correlation of the human skull. Philosophical Transactions of the Royal Society. London, 255-264 (read online).
- Pearson, K., & Lee, A. (5 July 1897). Mathematical contributions to the theory of evolution: On the relative variation and correlation in civilized and uncivilized races. Proceedings of the Royal Society, 61, 343-57 (read online).
- Pearson, K., & Lee, A. (1901). Mathematical contributions to the theory of evolution—VIII. On the Inheritance of characters not capable of exact quantitative measurement. Philosophical Transactions, 195A, 79-150 (read online).
- Pearson, K., & Lee, A. (February 1903). On the laws of inheritance in man. Biometrika, 2, 357-462 (read online).
- Pearson, K., Lee, A., & Bramley-Moore, L. (1899). Mathematical contributions to the theory of evolution: VI Genetic (reproductive) selection: Inheritance of fertility in man, and of fecundity in Thoroughbred race-horses, Philosophical Transactions, 192A, 257-330 (read online).
