= Karl Pearson =

English eugenicist and polymath (1857–1936)

Karl Pearson FRS
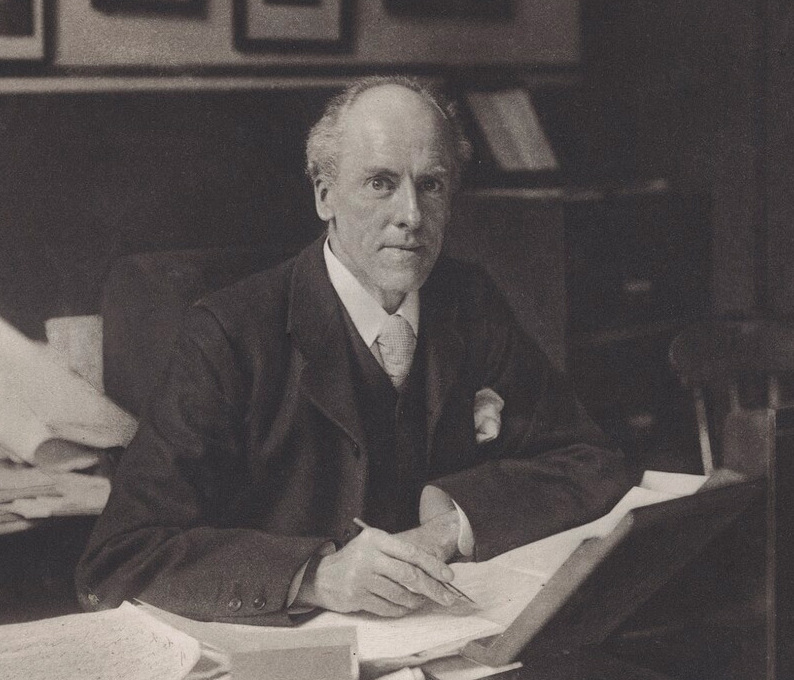
- Pearson in 1910
- Born: 27 March 1857; Islington, London, England
- Died: 27 April 1936 (aged 79); Coldharbour, Surrey, England
- Education: King's College, Cambridge; University of Heidelberg; University of Berlin
- Known for: Chi-square distribution; Contingency table; Eugenics; Histogram; Kurtosis; Mode; Pearson distribution; Pearson's chi-squared test; Pearson's r; Phi coefficient; Principal component analysis; Random walk; The Grammar of Science
- Children: Egon Pearson; Helga Hacker
- Awards: Darwin Medal (1898); Weldon Memorial Prize (1912)
- Scientific career
- Fields: Lawyer, Germanist, eugenicist, mathematician and statistician (primarily the last)
- Workplaces: University College London; University of Cambridge
- Academic advisors: Francis Galton
- Doctoral students: Joseph Oscar Irwin
- Other notable students: Philip Hall; John Wishart; Julia Bell; Nicholas Georgescu-Roegen; Ethel Elderton

Karl Pearson (/ˈpɪərsən/; 27 March 1857 – 27 April 1936) was an English biostatistician and mathematician. He has been credited with establishing the discipline of mathematical statistics. He founded the world's first university statistics department at University College London in 1911, and contributed significantly to the field of biometrics. Pearson was also a proponent of Social Darwinism and eugenics, and his thought is an example of what is today described as scientific racism. Pearson was a protégé and biographer of Sir Francis Galton. He edited and completed both William Kingdon Clifford's Common Sense of the Exact Sciences (1885) and Isaac Todhunter's History of the Theory of Elasticity, Vol. 1 (1886–1893) and Vol. 2 (1893), following their deaths.

== Early life and education ==
Pearson was born in Islington, London, into a Quaker family. His father was William Pearson QC of the Inner Temple, and his mother Fanny (née Smith), and he had two siblings, Arthur and Amy. Pearson attended University College School, followed by King's College, Cambridge, in 1876 to study mathematics, graduating in 1879 as Third Wrangler in the Mathematical Tripos. He then travelled to Germany to study physics at the University of Heidelberg under G. H. Quincke and metaphysics under Kuno Fischer. He next visited the University of Berlin, where he attended the lectures of the physiologist Emil du Bois-Reymond on Darwinism (Emil was a brother of Paul du Bois-Reymond, the mathematician). Pearson also studied Roman Law, taught by Bruns and Mommsen, medieval and 16th century German Literature, and Socialism. He became an accomplished historian and Germanist and spent much of the 1880s in Berlin, Heidelberg, Vienna, Saig bei Lenzkirch, and Brixlegg. He wrote on Passion plays, religion, Goethe, Werther, as well as sex-related themes, and was a founder of the Men and Women's Club.

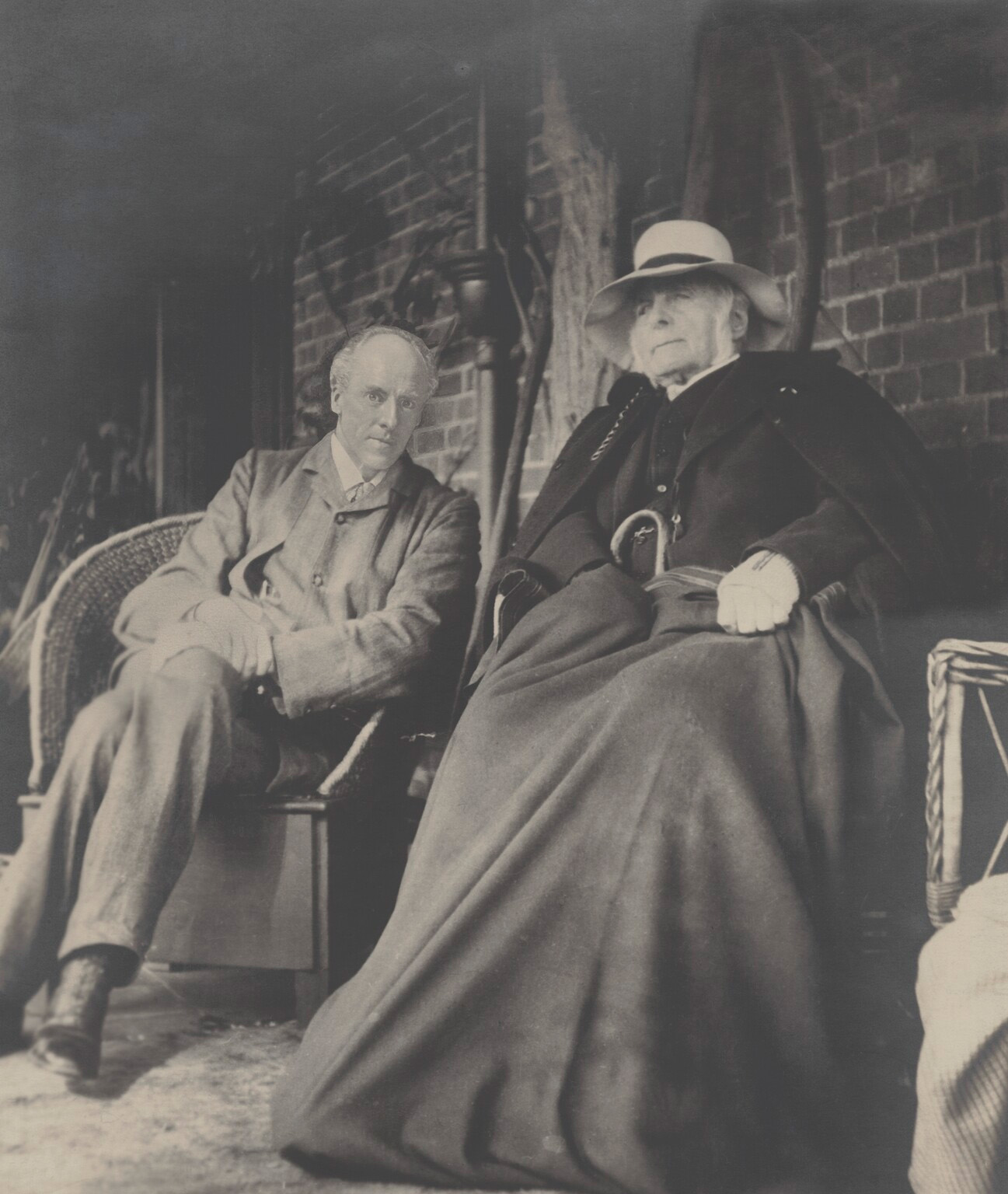
Pearson with Sir Francis Galton, 1909 or 1910

Pearson was offered a Germanics post at King's College, Cambridge. Comparing Cambridge students to those he knew from Germany, Karl found German students inathletic and weak. He wrote to his mother, "I used to think athletics and sport was overestimated at Cambridge, but now I think it cannot be too highly valued."

On returning to England in 1880, Pearson first went to Cambridge:

Back in Cambridge, I worked in the engineering shops, but drew up the schedule in Mittel- and Althochdeutsch for the Medieval Languages Tripos.

In his first book, The New Werther, Pearson gives a clear indication of why he studied so many diverse subjects:

I rush from science to philosophy, and from philosophy to our old friends the poets; and then, over-wearied by too much idealism, I fancy I become practical in returning to science. Have you ever attempted to conceive all there is in the world worth knowing—that not one subject in the universe is unworthy of study? The giants of literature, the mysteries of many-dimensional space, the attempts of Boltzmann and Crookes to penetrate Nature's very laboratory, the Kantian theory of the universe, and the latest discoveries in embryology, with their wonderful tales of the development of life—what an immensity beyond our grasp! [...] Mankind seems on the verge of a new and glorious discovery. What Newton did to simplify the planetary motions must now be done to unite in one whole the various isolated theories of mathematical physics.

Pearson then returned to London to study law, emulating his father. Quoting Pearson's own account:

Coming to London, I read in chambers in Lincoln's Inn, drew up bills of sale, and was called to the Bar, but varied legal studies by lecturing on heat at Barnes, on Martin Luther at Hampstead, and on Lassalle and Marx on Sundays at revolutionary clubs around Soho.

== Career ==
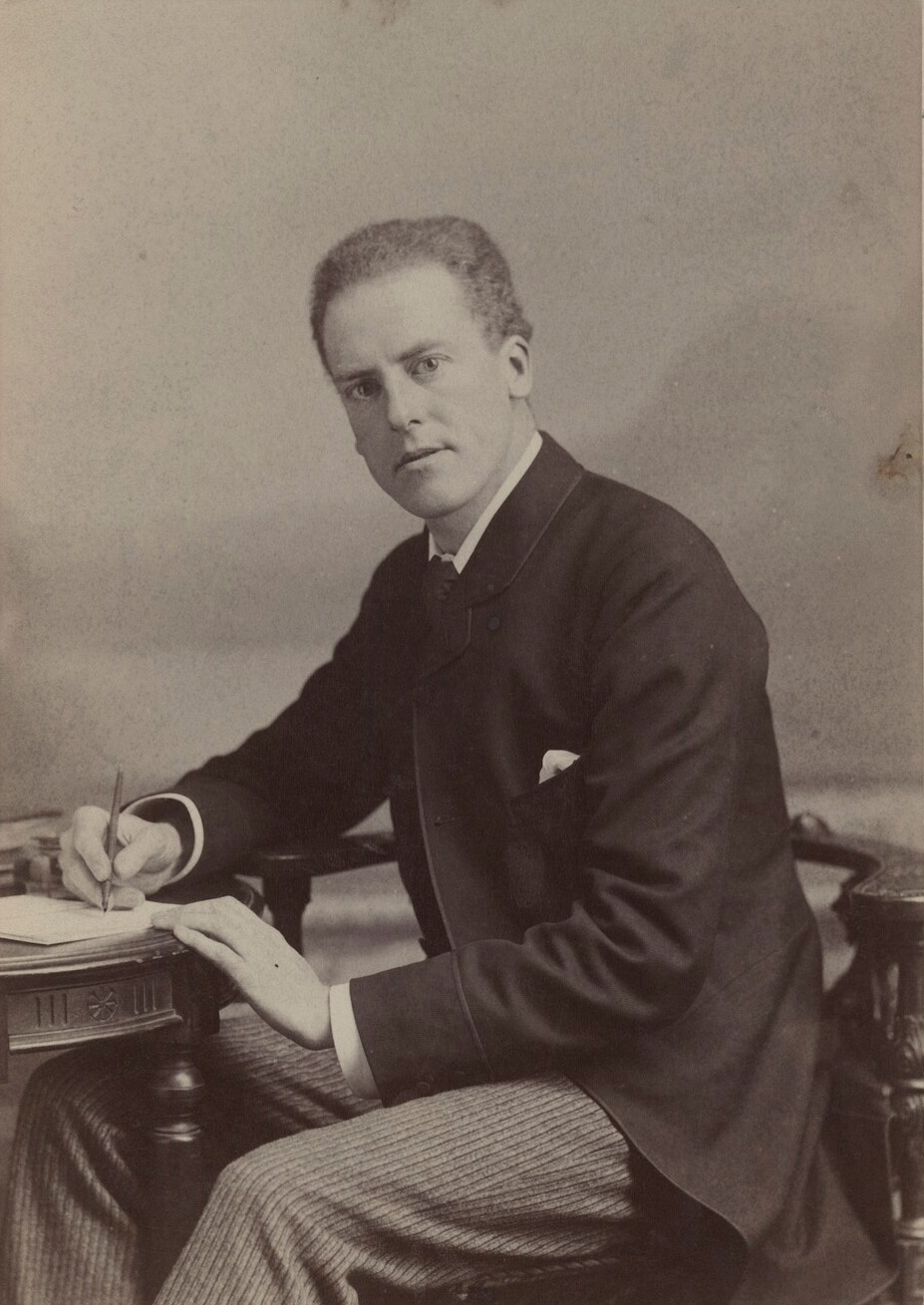
1890 photo of a young Karl Pearson

His next career move was to the Inner Temple, where he read law until 1881 (although he never practised). After this, he returned to mathematics, deputising for the mathematics professor at King's College London in 1881 and for the professor at University College London in 1883. In 1884, he was appointed to the Goldsmid Chair of Applied Mathematics and Mechanics at University College London. Pearson became the editor of Common Sense of the Exact Sciences (1885) when William Kingdon Clifford died. 1891 saw him also appointed to the professorship of Geometry at Gresham College; here he met Walter Frank Raphael Weldon, a zoologist who had some interesting problems requiring quantitative solutions. The collaboration, in biometry and evolutionary theory, was a fruitful one and lasted until Weldon died in 1906. Weldon introduced Pearson to Charles Darwin's cousin Francis Galton, who was interested in aspects of evolution such as heredity and eugenics. Pearson became Galton's protégé.

After Galton's death in 1911, Pearson embarked on producing his definitive biography—a three-volume tome of narrative, letters, genealogies, commentaries, and photographs—published in 1914, 1924, and 1930, with much of Pearson's own money paying for their print runs. The biography, done "to satisfy myself and without regard to traditional standards, to the needs of publishers or to the tastes of the reading public", triumphed Galton's life, work and personal heredity. He predicted that Galton, rather than Charles Darwin, would be remembered as the most prodigious grandson of Erasmus Darwin.

When Galton died, he left the residue of his estate to the University of London for a chair in Eugenics. Pearson was the first holder of this chair—the Galton Chair of Eugenics, later the Galton Chair of Genetics—in accordance with Galton's wishes. Pearson formed the Department of Applied Statistics (with financial support from the Drapers' Company), which combined the Biometric and Galton Laboratories. He remained with the department until his retirement in 1933, and continued to work until his death.

== Personal life ==
In 1890, Pearson married Maria Sharpe. The couple had three children: Sigrid Loetitia Pearson, Helga Sharpe Pearson, and Egon Pearson, who became a statistician himself and succeeded his father as head of the Applied Statistics Department at University College. Maria died in 1928 and in 1929 Karl married Margaret Victoria Child, a co-worker at the Biometric Laboratory. He and his family lived at 7 Well Road in Hampstead, now marked with a blue plaque. He died at Coldharbour, Surrey, on 27 April 1936.

== Einstein and Pearson's work ==
When the 23-year-old Albert Einstein started the Olympia Academy study group in 1902, with his two younger friends, Maurice Solovine and Conrad Habicht, his first reading suggestion was Pearson's The Grammar of Science. This book covered several themes that were later to become part of the theories of Einstein and other scientists. Pearson asserted that the laws of nature are relative to the perceptive ability of the observer. Irreversibility of natural processes, he argued, is a purely relative conception. An observer who travels at the exact velocity of light would see an eternal now, or an absence of motion. He speculated that an observer who travelled faster than light would see time reversal, similar to a cinema film being run backwards. Pearson also discussed antimatter, the fourth dimension, and wrinkles in time.

Pearson's relativity was based on idealism, in the sense of ideas or pictures in a mind. "There are many signs", he wrote, "that a sound idealism is surely replacing, as a basis for natural philosophy, the crude materialism of the older physicists." (Preface to second Ed., The Grammar of Science) Further, he stated, "... science is in reality a classification and analysis of the contents of the mind ... In truth, the field of science is much more consciousness than an external world." (Ibid., Ch. II, § 6) "Law in the scientific sense is thus essentially a product of the human mind and has no meaning apart from man." (Ibid., Ch. III, § 4)

== Political views and eugenics ==
Pearson was a zealous atheist, freethinker, and socialist. He gave lectures on such issues as "the woman's question" (this was the era of the suffragist movement in the UK) and upon Karl Marx. His commitment to socialism and its ideals led him to refuse the offer of being created an OBE (Officer of the Order of the British Empire) in 1920 and also to refuse a knighthood in 1935.

A eugenicist who applied social Darwinism to entire nations, Pearson saw war against "inferior races" as a logical implication of the theory of evolution. "My view – and I think it may be called the scientific view of a nation", he wrote, "is that of an organized whole, kept up to a high pitch of internal efficiency by insuring that its numbers are substantially recruited from the better stocks, and kept up to a high pitch of external efficiency by contest, chiefly by way of war with inferior races." He reasoned that, if August Weismann's theory of germ plasm is correct, the nation is wasting money when it tries to improve people who come from "poor stock".

Weismann argued that acquired characteristics could not be inherited. Therefore, training benefits only the trained generation. Their children will not exhibit the learned improvements and, in turn, will need to be improved. "No degenerate and feeble stock will ever be converted into healthy and sound stock by the accumulated effects of education, good laws, and sanitary surroundings. Such means may render the individual members of a stock passable if not strong members of society, but the same process will have to be gone through again and again with their offspring, and this in ever-widening circles, if the stock, owing to the conditions in which society has placed it, is able to increase its numbers."

History shows me one way, and one way only, in which a high state of civilization has been produced, namely, the struggle of race with race, and the survival of the physically and mentally fitter race. If you want to know whether the lower races of man can evolve a higher type, I fear the only course is to leave them to fight it out among themselves, and even then the struggle for existence between individual and individual, between tribe and tribe, may not be supported by that physical selection due to a particular climate on which probably so much of the Aryan's success depended.

In The Myth of the Jewish Race Raphael and Jennifer Patai cite Karl Pearson's 1925 opposition (in the first issue of the journal Annals of Eugenics which he founded) to Jewish immigration into Britain. Pearson alleged that these immigrants "will develop into a parasitic race. [...] Taken on the average, and regarding both sexes, this alien Jewish population is somewhat inferior physically and mentally to the native population".

Pearson concluding remarks on stepping down as editor of the Annals of Eugenics, indicate a sense of failure of his aim to use the scientific study of eugenics as a guide for moral conduct and public policy.

My endeavour during the twenty-two years in which I have held the post of Galton Professor has been to prove in the first place that Eugenics can be developed as an academic study, and in the second place to make the conclusions drawn from that study a ground for social propagandism only when there are sound scientific reasons upon which to base our judgments and as a result our opinions as to moral conduct. Even at the present day there are far too many general impressions drawn from limited or too often wrongly interpreted experience, and far too many inadequately demonstrated and too lightly accepted theories for any nation to proceed hastily with unlimited Eugenic legislation. This statement, however, must never be taken as an excuse for indefinitely suspending all Eugenic teaching and every form of communal action in matters of sex.

Nonetheless, in June 2020 UCL announced that it was renaming two buildings which had been named after Pearson, because of his connection with eugenics.

== Contributions to biometrics ==
Karl Pearson was important in the founding of the school of biometrics, which was one of several competing theories to describe evolution and population inheritance at the turn of the 20th century. His series of eighteen papers, "Mathematical Contributions to the Theory of Evolution" established him as the founder of the biometrical school for inheritance. In fact, Pearson devoted much time during 1893 to 1904 to developing statistical techniques for biometry. These techniques, which are widely used today for statistical analysis, include the chi-squared test, standard deviation, and correlation and regression coefficients. Pearson's Law of Ancestral Heredity stated that germ plasm consisted of heritable elements inherited from the parents as well as from more distant ancestors, the proportion of which varied for different traits. Karl Pearson was a follower of Galton, and although the two differed in some respects, Pearson used a substantial amount of Francis Galton's statistical concepts in his formulation of the biometrical school for inheritance, such as the law of regression. The biometric school, unlike the Mendelians, focused not on providing a mechanism for inheritance, but rather on providing a mathematical description for inheritance that was not causal in nature. While Galton proposed a discontinuous theory of evolution, in which species would have to change via large jumps rather than small changes that built up over time, Pearson pointed out flaws in Galton's argument and actually used Galton's ideas to further a continuous theory of evolution, whereas the Mendelians favored a discontinuous theory of evolution. While Galton focused primarily on the application of statistical methods to the study of heredity, Pearson and his colleague Weldon expanded statistical reasoning to the fields of inheritance, variation, correlation, and natural and sexual selection.

For Pearson, the theory of evolution was not intended to identify a biological mechanism that explained patterns of inheritance, whereas Mendelian's theory postulated the gene as the mechanism for inheritance. Pearson criticized Bateson and other biologists for their failure to adopt biometrical techniques in their study of evolution. Pearson criticized biologists who did not focus on the statistical validity of their theories, stating that "before we can accept [any cause of a progressive change] as a factor we must have not only shown its plausibility but if possible have demonstrated its quantitative ability" Biologists had succumbed to "almost metaphysical speculation as to the causes of heredity," which had replaced the process of experimental data collection that actually might allow scientists to narrow down potential theories.

For Pearson, laws of nature were useful for making accurate predictions and for concisely describing trends in observed data. Causation was the experience "that a certain sequence has occurred and recurred in the past". Thus, identifying a particular mechanism of genetics was not a worthy pursuit of biologists, who should instead focus on mathematical descriptions of empirical data. This, in part led to the fierce debate between the biometricians and the Mendelians, including Bateson. After Bateson rejected one of Pearson's manuscripts that described a new theory for the variability of an offspring, or homotyposis, Pearson and Weldon established Biometrika in 1902. Although the biometric approach to inheritance eventually lost to the Mendelian approach, the techniques Pearson and the biometricians at the time developed are vital to studies of biology and evolution today.

== Contributions to statistics ==
Pearson's work was all-embracing in the wide application and development of mathematical statistics, and encompassed the fields of biology, epidemiology, anthropometry, medicine, psychology and social history. In 1901, with Weldon and Galton, he founded the journal Biometrika whose object was the development of statistical theory. He edited this journal until his death. Among those who assisted Pearson in his research were a number of female mathematicians who included Beatrice Mabel Cave-Browne-Cave, Frances Cave-Browne-Cave, and Alice Lee. He also founded the journal Annals of Eugenics (now Annals of Human Genetics) in 1925. He published the Drapers' Company Research Memoirs largely to provide a record of the output of the Department of Applied Statistics not published elsewhere.

Pearson's thinking underpins many of the 'classical' statistical methods which are in common use today. Examples of his contributions are:

- Correlation coefficient. The correlation coefficient (first developed by Auguste Bravais and Francis Galton) was defined as a product-moment, and its relationship with linear regression was studied. The correlation coefficient is abbreviated as r.
- Method of moments. Pearson introduced moments, a concept borrowed from physics, as descriptive statistics and for the fitting of distributions to samples.
- Pearson's system of continuous curves. A system of continuous univariate probability distributions that came to form the basis of the now conventional continuous probability distributions. Since the system is complete up to the fourth moment, it is a powerful complement to the Pearsonian method of moments.
- Chi distance. A precursor and special case of the Mahalanobis distance.
- p-value. Defined as the probability measure of the complement of the ball with the hypothesized value as center point and chi distance as radius.
- Foundations of statistical hypothesis testing theory and statistical decision theory. In the seminal "On the criterion..." paper, Pearson proposed testing the validity of hypothesized values by evaluating the chi distance between the hypothesized and the empirically observed values via the p-value, which was proposed in the same paper. The use of preset evidence criteria, so called alpha type-I error probabilities, was later proposed by Jerzy Neyman and Egon Pearson.
- Pearson's chi-squared test. A hypothesis test using normal approximation for discrete data.
- Principal component analysis. The method of fitting a linear subspace to multivariate data by minimising the chi distances.
- The first introduction of the histogram is usually credited to Pearson.

== Awards from professional bodies ==
Pearson achieved widespread recognition across a range of disciplines and his membership of, and awards from, various professional bodies reflects this:

- 1896: elected FRS: Fellow of the Royal Society
- 1898: awarded the Darwin Medal
- 1911: awarded the honorary degree of LLD from the University of St Andrews
- 1911: awarded a DSc from University of London
- 1920: offered (and refused) the OBE
- 1932: awarded the Rudolf Virchow medal by the Berliner Anthropologische Gesellschaft
- 1934: offered (and refused) the Guy Medal of the Royal Statistical Society
- 1935: offered (and refused) a knighthood

He was also elected an Honorary Fellow of King's College, Cambridge, the Royal Society of Edinburgh, University College London and the Royal Society of Medicine, and a Member of the Actuaries' Club. A sesquicentenary conference was held in London on 23 March 2007, to celebrate the 150th anniversary of his birth.

== Collections ==
Pearson's archive was donated to University College London by his children Egon Pearson and Helga Hacker between 1967 and 1980. The collection comprises personal and family papers, extensive notes on Pearson's lectures, publications, and scientific work, and correspondence. Pearson's archive also includes the papers of scientist F.R. Weldon, papers relating to the Biometrika journal, information on the Galton Laboratory during wartime, and extensive research for Pearson's biography of Francis Galton.

University College London also holds material relating to Pearson in other collections:

- Galton Papers - personal archive of Sir Francis Galton;
- Galton Laboratory book collection - working library of the Galton Laboratory founded on Sir Francis Galton's library;
- Galton Laboratory Records - records of the Galton Laboratory established and led by Pearson;
- Modern Genetics Collections - publications from the Galton Laboratory, including many works by Pearson, and historical educational journals from the Institute of Education;
- Hacker Papers - research collected by Pearson's daughter Helga Hacker whilst writing a biography of her father;
- Egon Sharpe Pearson Papers - personal archive of Pearson's son;
- Sharpe Papers - personal archive of the Kenrick, Reid, Rogers and Sharpe families;
- Pearson Letters - correspondence from Pearson to Edgar Charles Fieller (who worked at the Galton Laboratory) discussing probability and random selection.

== Publications ==
- Pearson, Karl (1880). The New Werther. C, Kegan Paul & Co.
- Pearson, Karl (1882). The Trinity: A Nineteenth Century Passion-play. Cambridge: E. Johnson.
- Pearson, Karl (1887). Die Fronica. Strassburg: K.J. Trübner
- Pearson, Karl (1887). The Moral Basis of Socialism. William Reeves, London.
- Pearson, Karl (1888). The Ethic of Freethought. London: T. Fisher Unwin. Rep. University Press of the Pacific, 2002.
- Pearson, Karl (1892). The Grammar of Science. London: Walter Scott. Dover Publications, 2004 ISBN 0-486-49581-7
- Pearson, Karl (1892). The New University for London: A Guide to its History and a Criticism of its Defects. London: T. Fisher Unwin.
- Pearson, K (1896). "Mathematical Contributions to the Theory of Evolution. III. Regression, Heredity and Panmixia". Philosophical Transactions of the Royal Society of London. 187: 253–318. Bibcode:1896RSPTA.187..253P. doi:10.1098/rsta.1896.0007.
- Pearson, Karl (1897). The Chances of Death and Other Studies in Evolution, 2 Vol. London: Edward Arnold.
- Pearson, Karl (1904). On the Theory of Contingency and its Relation to Association and Normal Correlation. London: Dulau & Co.
- Pearson, Karl (1905). On the General Theory of Skew Correlation and Non-linear Regression. London: Dulau & Co.
- Pearson, Karl (1906). A Mathematical Theory of Random Migration. London: Dulau & Co.
- Pearson, Karl (1907). Studies in National Deterioration. London: Dulau & Co.
- Pearson, Karl, & Pollard, A.F. Campbell (1907). An Experimental Study of the Stresses in Masonry Dams. London: Dulau & Co.
- Pearson, Karl (1907). A First Study of the Statistics of Pulmonary Tuberculosis. London: Dulau & Co.
- Pearson, Karl, & Barrington, Amy (1909). A First Study of the Inheritance of Vision and of the Relative Influence of Heredity and Environment on Sight. London: Dulau & Co.
- Pearson, Karl; Reynolds, W. D., & Stanton, W. F. (1909). On a Practical Theory of Elliptical and Pseudo-elliptical Arches, with Special Reference to the Ideal Masonry Arch.
- Pearson, Karl (1909). The Groundwork of Eugenics. London: Dulau & Co.
- Pearson, Karl (1909). The Scope and Importance to the State of the Science of National Eugenics. London: Dulau & Co.
- Pearson, Karl, & Barrington, Amy (1910). A Preliminary Study of Extreme Alcoholism in Adults. London: Dulau & Co.
- Pearson, Karl, & Elderton, Ethel M. (1910). A First Study of the Influence of Parental Alcoholism on the Physique and Ability of the Offspring. London: Dulau & Co.
- Pearson, Karl (1910). The Influence of Parental Alcoholism on the Physique and Ability of the Offspring: A Reply to the Cambridge Economists. London: Dulau & Co.
- Pearson, Karl, & Elderton, Ethel M. (1910). A Second Study of the Influence of Parental Alcoholism on the Physique and Ability of the Offspring. London: Dulau & Co.
- Pearson, Karl (1911). An Attempt to Correct some of the Misstatements Made by Sir Victor Horsley and Mary D. Sturge, M.D. in the Criticisms of the Galton Laboratory Memoir: A First Study of the Influence of Parental Alcoholism, &c. London: Dulau & Co.
- Pearson, Karl; Nettleship, Edward, & Usher, Charles (1911–1913). A Monograph on Albinism in Man, 2 Vol. London: Dulau & Co., Ltd.
- Pearson, Karl (1912). The Problem of Practical Eugenics. London: Dulau & Co.
- Pearson, Karl (1912). Tuberculosis, Heredity and Environment. London: Dulau & Co.
- Pearson, Karl (1913). On the Correlation of Fertility with Social Value: A Cooperative Study. London: Dulau & Co.
- Pearson, Karl, & Jaederholm, Gustav A. (1914). Mendelism and the Problem of Mental Defect, II: On the Continuity of Mental Defect. London: Dulau & Co.
- Pearson, Karl; Williams, M.H., & Bell, Julia (1914). A Statistical Study of Oral Temperatures in School Children. London: Dulau & Co.
- Pearson, Karl (1914-24-30). The Life, Letters and Labours of Francis Galton, 3 Vol. Cambridge University Press, Cambridge.
- Pearson, Karl (1915). Some Recent Misinterpretations of the Problem of Nurture and Nature. Cambridge University Press.
- Pearson, Karl; Young, A.W., & Elderton, Ethel (1918). On the Torsion Resulting from Flexure in Prisms with Cross-sections of Uni-axial Symmetry Only. Cambridge University Press.
- Pearson, Karl, & Bell, Julia (1919). A Study of the Long Bones of the English Skeleton. Cambridge: Cambridge University Press.
- Pearson, Karl (1920). The Science of Man: its Needs and its Prospects. Cambridge University Press.
- Pearson, Karl & Gavin, Adelaide G. (1921). On the Sesamoids of the Knee-Joint. Biometrika, Vol. 13.
- Pearson, Karl, & Karn, Mary Noel (1922). Study of the Data Provided by a Baby-clinic in a Large Manufacturing Town. Cambridge University Press.
- Pearson, Karl (1922). Francis Galton, 1822–1922: A Centenary Appreciation. Cambridge University Press.
- Pearson, Karl (1923). On the Relationship of Health to the Psychical and Physical Characters in School Children. Cambridge University Press.
- Pearson, Karl (1926). On the Skull and Portraits of George Buchanan. Edinburgh, London: Oliver & Boyd.

Articles

- Pearson, Karl (1883). "Maimonides and Spinoza". Mind. 8 (31): 338–353. doi:10.1093/mind/os-VIII.31.338.
- Pearson, Karl (1885). "On a Certain Atomic Hypothesis". Transactions of the Cambridge Philosophical Society. 14: 71–120.
- Pearson, Karl (1890). "On Wöhler's Experiments on Alternating Stress". The Messenger of Mathematics. XX: 21–37.
- Pearson, Karl (1891). "Ether Squirts". American Journal of Mathematics. 13 (4): 309–72. doi:10.2307/2369570. JSTOR 2369570.
- Pearson, Karl (1897). "On Telegony in Man," Proceedings of the Royal Society of London, Vol. LX, pp. 273–283.
- Pearson, Karl (1897). "On a Form of Spurious Correlation which May Arise when Indices are Used in the Measurement of Organs," Proceedings of the Royal Society of London, Vol. LX, pp. 489–502.
- Pearson, Karl (1899). "On the Reconstruction of the Stature of Prehistoric Races". Philosophical Transactions of the Royal Society of London. 192: 169–243. Bibcode:1899RSPTA.192..169P. doi:10.1098/rsta.1899.0004.
- Pearson, Karl; Lee, Alice; Bramley-Moore, Leslie (1899). "Genetic (Reproductive) Selection". Philosophical Transactions of the Royal Society of London. 192: 257–330. Bibcode:1899RSPTA.192..257P. doi:10.1098/rsta.1899.0006.
- Pearson, Karl, & Whiteley, M.A. (1899). "Data for the Problem of Evolution in Man, I: A First Study of the Variability and Correlation of the Hand," Proceedings of the Royal Society of London, Vol. LXV, pp. 126–151.
- Pearson, Karl, & Beeton, Mary (1899). "Data for the Problem of Evolution in Man, II: A First Study on the Inheritance of Longevity and the Selective Death-rate in Man," Proceedings of the Royal Society of London, Vol. LXV, pp. 290–305.
- Pearson, Karl (1900). "On the Law of Reversion," Proceedings of the Royal Society of London, Vol. LXVI, pp. 140–164.
- Pearson, Karl; Beeton, M., & Yule, G.U. (1900). "On the Correlation Between Duration of Life and the Number of Offspring," Proceedings of the Royal Society of London, Vol. LXVII, pp. 159–179.
- Pearson, Karl (1900). "On the Criterion that a Given System of Deviations from the Probable in the Case of a Correlated System of Variables is Such that it can be Reasonably Supposed to Have Arisen from Random Sampling," Philosophical Magazine, 5th Series, Vol. L, pp. 157–175.
- Pearson, Karl (1901). "On Lines and Planes of Closest Fit to Systems of Points in Space," Philosophical Magazine, 6th Series, Vol. II, pp. 559–572.
- Pearson, Karl (1902–1903). "The Law of Ancestral Heredity," Biometrika, Vol. II, pp. 221–229.
- Pearson, Karl (1903). "On a General Theory of the Method of False Position", Philosophical Magazine, 6th Series, Vol. 5, pp. 658–668.
- Pearson, Karl (1907). "On the Influence of Past Experience on Future Expectation," Philosophical Magazine, 6th Series, Vol. XIII, pp. 365–378.
- Pearson, Karl, & Gibson, Winifred (1907). "Further Considerations on the Correlations of Stellar Characters," Monthly Notices of the Royal Astronomical Society, Vol. LXVIII, pp. 415–448.
- Pearson, Karl (1910). "A Myth About Edward the Confessor". The English Historical Review. 25 (XCIX): 517–520. doi:10.1093/ehr/xxv.xcix.517.
- Pearson, Karl (1920). "The Problems of Anthropology". The Scientific Monthly. 11 (5): 451–458. Bibcode:1920SciMo..11..451P. JSTOR 6421.
- Pearson, Karl (1930). "On a New Theory of Progressive Evolution," Annals of Eugenics, Vol. IV, Nos. 1–2, pp. 1–40.
- Pearson, Karl (1931). "On the Inheritance of Mental Disease," Annals of Eugenics, Vol. IV, Nos. 3–4, pp. 362–380.

Miscellany

- Pearson, Karl (1885). The Common Sense of the Exact Sciences. London: Kegan, Paul, Trench & Co. (editor).
- Pearson, Karl (1886–1893). A History of the Theory of Elasticity and of the Strength of Materials from Galilei to the Present Time, Vol. 2, Vol. 3. Cambridge University Press (editor).
  - Pearson, Karl (1889). The Elastical Researches of Barré de Saint-Venant. Cambridge University Press (editor).
- Pearson, Karl (1888). The Positive Creed of Freethought: with Some Remarks on the Relation of Freethought to Socialism. Being a Lecture Delivered at South Place Institute. London: William Reeves.
- Pearson, Karl (1901). National Life from the Stand-point of Science: An Address Delivered at Newcastle. London: Adam & Charles Black.
- Pearson, Karl (1908). A Second Study of the Statistics of Pulmonary Tuberculosis: Marital Infection. London: Dulau & Co. (editor).
- Pearson, Karl (1910). Nature and Nurture, the Problem of the Future: A Presidential Address. London: Dulau & Co.
- Pearson, Karl (1911). The Academic Aspect of the Science of Eugenics: A Lecture Delivered to Undergraduates. London: Dulau & Co.
- Pearson, Karl (1912). Treasury of Human Inheritance, 2 Vol. Dulau & Co., London (editor).
- Pearson, Karl (1912). Eugenics and Public Health: An Address to Public Health Officers. London: Dulau & Co.
- Pearson, Karl (1912). Darwinism, Medical Progress and Eugenics. The Cavendish Lecture: An Address to the Medical Profession. London: Dulau & Co.
- Pearson, Karl (1912). Social Problems, their Treatment, Past, Present, and Future: A Lecture. London: Dulau & Co.
- Pearson, Karl (1914). On the Handicapping of the First-born: Being a Lecture Delivered at the Galton Laboratory. London: Dulau & Co.
- Pearson, Karl (1914). Tables for Statisticians and Biometricians. Cambridge: Cambridge University Press (editor).
- Pearson, Karl (1919–22). Tracts for Computers. Cambridge University Press (editor).
- Pearson, Karl (1921). Side Lights on the Evolution of Man: Being a Lecture Delivered at the Royal Institution. Cambridge University Press.
- Pearson, Karl (1922). Tables of the Incomplete Γ-Function. London: Pub. for the Department of Scientific and Industrial Research by H.M. Stationery Office.
- Pearson, Karl (1923). Charles Darwin, 1809–1882: An Appreciation. Being a Lecture Delivered to the Teachers of the London County Council. Cambridge University Press.
- Pearson, Karl (1927). The Right of the Unborn Child: Being a Lecture Delivered... to Teachers from the London County Council Schools. Cambridge University Press.
- Pearson, Karl (1934). Tables of the Incomplete Beta-function. Cambridge University Press. second ed., 1968 (editor).

== See also ==
- Galton Laboratory
- Francis Galton
- Biophysics
- Ethel M. Elderton
- Julia Bell
- Gresham Professor of Geometry § List of Gresham Professors of Geometry
- Kikuchi Dairoku, a close friend and contemporary of Karl Pearson at University College School and Cambridge University
- Scientific racism
- Eugenics
